The Russian Chess Championship has taken various forms.

Winners by year (men)

Imperial Russia
In 1874, Emanuel Schiffers defeated Andrey Chardin in a match held in St. Petersburg with five wins and four losses. Schiffers was considered the first Russian champion until his student, Mikhail Chigorin, defeated him in a match held in St. Petersburg in 1879. Chigorin won with seven wins, four losses, and two draws.

In 1899, the format of the championship was changed to a round-robin tournament known as the All-Russian Masters' Tournament. The winners were:
{| class="sortable wikitable"
! # !! Year !! City !! Winner
|-
| 1 || 1899 || Moscow || Mikhail Chigorin
|-
| 2 || 1900/1901 || Moscow || Mikhail Chigorin
|-
| 3 ||1903 || Kiev || Mikhail Chigorin
|-
| 4 || 1905/1906 || Saint Petersburg || Gersz Salwe
|-
| 5 || 1907 || Łódź || Akiba Rubinstein
|-
| 6 || 1909 || Vilna || Akiba Rubinstein
|-
| 7 || 1912 || Vilna || Akiba Rubinstein
|-
| 8 || 1913/1914 || Saint Petersburg || Alexander Alekhine & Aron Nimzowitsch
|}

RSFSR
After the formation of the USSR the USSR Chess Championship was established as the national championship. However the Russian championship continued to exist as the championship of the RSFSR. The first two USSR championships in 1920 and 1923 were also recognized as RSFSR championships; the modern numbering of Russian championships begins with these two tournaments. The cities Moscow and Leningrad held their own championships and their players were ineligible to play in the RSFSR championship. However, some did participate as outside competitors: for example, Taimanov finished with the same number of points as Tarasov in the 1960 championship, but only Tarasov was awarded the title as Taimanov was from Leningrad.

Rashid Nezhmetdinov held the record of five wins of the Russian Chess Championship.

{| class="sortable wikitable"
! # !! Year !! City !! Winner
|-
| 1 || 1920 || Moscow ||Alexander Alekhine
|-
| 2 || 1923 || Petrograd || Peter Romanovsky
|-
| 3 || 1928 || Moscow || Peter Izmailov
|-
| 4 || 1934 || Moscow || Sergey Belavenets
|-
| 5 || 1935 || Gorky || Alexander Tolush
|-
| 6 || 1946 || Sverdlovsk || Isaac Boleslavsky
|-
| 7 || 1947 || Kuybyshev || Nikolay Novotelnov
|-
| 8 || 1948 || Saratov || Nikolay Aratovsky, Georgy Ilivitsky
|-
| 9 || 1949 || Yaroslavl || Peter Dubinin, Georgy Ilivitsky  
|-
| 10 || 1950 || Gorky || Rashid Nezhmetdinov
|-
| 11 || 1951 || Yaroslavl || Rashid Nezhmetdinov 
|-
| 12 || 1952 || Tula || Lev Aronin, Nikolai Krogius
|-
| 13 || 1953 || Saratov || Rashid Nezhmetdinov 
|-
| 14 || 1954 || Rostov-on-Don || Leonid Shamkovich
|-
| 15 || 1955 || Leningrad || Anatoly Lutikov
|-
| 16 || 1956 || Kislovodsk || Leonid Shamkovich
|-
| 17 || 1957 || Krasnodar || Rashid Nezhmetdinov 
|-
| 18 || 1958 || Sochi || Rashid Nezhmetdinov 
|-
| 19 || 1959 || Voronezh || Anatoly Lutikov 
|-
| 20 || 1960 || Perm || Vitaly Tarasov, Mark Taimanov (off contest)
|-
| 21 || 1961 || Omsk || Lev Polugaevsky
|-
| 22 || 1963 || Chelyabinsk || Anatoly Lein
|-
| 23 || 1964 || Kazan || Nikolai Krogius
|-
| 24 || 1966 || Saratov || Igor Zakharov, Anatoly Lein, Vladimir Sergievsky
|-
| 25 || 1968 || Grozny || Alexander Zaitsev
|-
| 26 || 1970 || Kuybyshev || Anatoly Karpov
|-
| 27 || 1971 || Penza || Oleg Dementiev, Valery Zilberstein
|-
| 28 || 1972 || Rostov-on-Don || Vitaly Tseshkovsky 
|-
| 29 || 1973 || Omsk || Valeri Korensky, Jurij Rusakov, Vitaly Tseshkovsky 
|-
| 30 || 1974 || Tula || Nukhim Rashkovsky 
|-
| 31 || 1976 || Novosibirsk || Nukhim Rashkovsky 
|-
| 32 || 1977 || Volgograd || Valerij Zhuravliov, Lev Psakhis
|-
| 33 || 1979 || Sverdlovsk || Alexander Panchenko 
|-
| 34 || 1980 || Kazan || Alexander Petrushin
|-
| 35 || 1981 || Vladimir || Pavel Zarubin
|-
| 36 || 1982 || Stavropol || Anatoly Vaisser, Valery Chekhov
|-
| 37 || 1984 || Bryansk || Gennady Tunik
|-
| 38 || 1985 || Sverdlovsk || Alexander Petrushin
|-
| 39 || 1986 || Smolensk || Veniamin Shtyrenkov
|-
| 40 || 1987 || Kursk || Andrei Kharitonov
|-
| 41 || 1988 || Voronezh || Ratmir Kholmov, Vadim Ruban
|-
| 42 || 1989 || Gorky || Alexey Vyzmanavin
|-
| 43 || 1990 || Kuybyshev || Andrei Kharlov, Vladimir Kramnik, Ruslan Shcherbakov, Maxim Sorokin
|-
| 44 || 1991 || Smolensk || Sergei Rublevsky
|}

Russian Federation
After the collapse of the Soviet Union, the Russian Championship was re-established as a national championship, and players from Moscow and St. Petersburg were allowed to participate. Prior to 2004, the championship was organized as a Swiss-style tournament except for 1997 and 1999, where a knockout format was used. In 2004, the tournament reverted to a round robin with the strongest players in the country directly seeded into the final (called the Superfinal) held in Moscow while others progress through qualifying tournaments.

{| class="sortable wikitable"
! # !! Date !! City !! Tournament system !! Winner !!  Notes !! Reference
|-
| 45 || 1992 || Oryol || Swiss || Alexei Gavrilov || || 
|-
| 46 || 1993 || Tyumen || Swiss || Alexei Bezgodov || || 
|-
| 47 || 1994 || Elista || Swiss || Peter Svidler || || 
|-
| 48 || 17–29 October 1995 || Elista || Swiss || Peter Svidler  || || 
|-
| 49 || 14–17 October 1996 || Elista || Swiss || Alexander Khalifman || || 
|-
| 50 || 20 May – 6 June 1997 || Elista || Knockout || Peter Svidler  || || 
|-
| 51 || 27 July – 8 August 1998 || Saint Petersburg || Swiss || Alexander Morozevich || || 
|-
| 52 || 15–28 December 1999 || Moscow || Knockout || Konstantin Sakaev || || 
|-
| 53 || 17–27 June 2000 || Samara || Swiss || Sergey Volkov || || 
|-
| 54 || 29 April – 9 May 2001 || Elista || Swiss || Alexander Motylev || on tiebreak over Alexander Lastin || 
|-
| 55 || 27 August – 4 September 2002 || Krasnodar || Swiss || Alexander Lastin || || 
|-
| 56 || 2–12 September 2003 || Krasnoyarsk || Swiss || Peter Svidler  || on tiebreak over Alexander Morozevich || 
|-
| 57 || 14–27 November 2004 || Moscow || Round-robin || Garry Kasparov || || 
|-
| 58 || 19–30 December 2005 || Moscow || Round-robin || Sergei Rublevsky || || 
|-
| 59 || 3–15 December 2006 || Moscow || Round-robin || Evgeny Alekseev || after a playoff match with Dmitry Jakovenko || 
|-
| 60 || 17–30 December 2007 || Moscow || Round-robin || Alexander Morozevich  || || 
|-
| 61 || 2–16 October 2008 || Moscow || Round-robin || Peter Svidler  || after a playoff with Evgeny Alekseev and Dmitry Jakovenko || 
|-
| 62 || 19–30 December 2009 || Moscow || Round-robin || Alexander Grischuk || || 
|-
| 63 || 10–22 December 2010 || Moscow || Round-robin || Ian Nepomniachtchi || after a playoff with Sergey Karjakin || 
|-
| 64 || 7–15 August 2011 || Moscow || Round-robin || Peter Svidler  || || 
|-
| 65 || 2–13 August 2012 || Moscow || Round-robin || Dmitry Andreikin || after a rapid playoff with Sergey Karjakin, Peter Svidler, Dmitry Jakovenko, Vladimir Potkin and Evgeny Alekseev || 
|-
| 66 || 4–15 October 2013 || Nizhny Novgorod || Round-robin || Peter Svidler  ||  after a playoff match with Ian Nepomniachtchi || 
|-
| 67 || 27 November – 8 December 2014 || Kazan || Round-robin || Igor Lysyj || || 
|-
| 68 || 8–21 August 2015 || Chita || Round-robin || Evgeny Tomashevsky || || 
|-
| 69 || 15–28 October 2016 || Novosibirsk || Round-robin || Alexander Riazantsev || ||
|-
| 70 || 2–15 December 2017 || Saint Petersburg || Round-robin || Peter Svidler  || after a playoff match with Nikita Vitiugov ||
|-
| 71 || 25 August - 5 September 2018 || Satka || Round-robin || Dmitry Andreikin  || after a playoff match with Dmitry Jakovenko ||
|-
| 72 || 10–23 August 2019 || Votkinsk – Izhevsk || Round-robin || Evgeny Tomashevsky  || ||
|-
| 73 || 5–16 December 2020 || Moscow || Round-robin || Ian Nepomniachtchi  || ||
|-
| 74 || 9–20 October 2021 || Ufa || Round-robin || Nikita Vitiugov || ||
|-
|75
|10–23 September 2022
|Cheboksary
|Round-robin
|Daniil Dubov
|after an Armageddon match with Sanan Sjugirov 
|
|}

Winners by year (women)

{| class="sortable wikitable"
! # !! Year !! City !! Winner
|-
| 1 || 1934 || Moscow || Vera Chudova
|-
| 2 || 1935 || Nizhny Novgorod || Nina Golubeva
|-
| 3 || 1947 || Ivanovo || Olga Strelova
|-
| 4 || 1948 || Kuybyshev || Alexandra Daibo
|-
| 5 || 1949 || Stavropol || Vera Tikhomirova
|-
| 6 || 1950 || Rostov-on-Don || Vera Tikhomirova
|-
| 7 || 1951 || Ivanovo || Tema Filanovskaya
|-
| 8 || 1952 || Saratov || Vera Tikhomirova
|-
| 9 || 1953 || Sochi || Vera Tikhomirova
|-
| 10 || 1954 || Nizhny Novgorod || Tema Filanovskaya
|-
| 11 || 1955 || Taganrog || Tema Filanovskaya, Polishchuk
|-
| 12 || 1956 || Tuapse || Valentina Borisenko
|-
| 13 || 1957 || Kaluga || Valentina Borisenko
|-
| 14 || 1958 || Saratov || Valentina Borisenko
|-
| 15 || 1959 || Yaroslavl || Klara Skegina
|-
| 16 || 1960 || Sochi || Valentina Borisenko
|-
| 17 || 1961 || Sverdlovsk || Klara Skegina
|-
| 18 || 1963 || Tula || Klara Skegina
|-
| 19 || 1964 || Dubna || Natalia Konopleva
|-
| 20 || 1966 || Krasnodar || Rimma Bilunova
|-
| 21 || 1968 || Nalchik || Rimma Bilunova
|-
| 22 || 1970 || Kostroma || Vera Ushakova (Timoshchenko)
|-
| 23 || 1971 || Krasnodar || Ludmila Lyubarskaya
|-
| 24 || 1972 || Volgograd || Ludmila Saunina
|-
| 25 || 1973 || Arkhangelsk || L. Vericheva
|-
| 26 || 1974 || Nalchik || Alexsandra Kislova
|-
| 27 || 1975 || Chelyabinsk || Alexsandra Kislova
|-
| 28 || 1976 || Penza || Valentina Kozlovskaya
|-
| 29 || 1977 || Kaliningrad || Natalia Alekhina
|-
| 30 || 1979 || Kaluga || Valentina Kozlovskaya, Ludmila Saunina
|-
| 31 || 1980 || Voronezh || Elena Akhmilovskaya
|-
| 32 || 1981 || Sverdlovsk || Nadezhda Putjatina
|-
| 33 || 1982 || Ordzhonikidze || Natalia Alekhina
|-
| 34 || 1984 || Kaliningrad || Larisa Polnareva
|-
| 35 || 1985 || Lipetsk || Ludmila Saunina
|-
| 36 || 1986 || Saratov || Alla Grinfeld, Ludmila Saunina
|-
| 37 || 1987 || Sverdlovsk || Tatiana Stepovaia
|-
| 38 || 1988 || Sverdlovsk || Tatiana Stepovaia
|-
| 39 || 1989 || Sverdlovsk || Tatiana Stepovaia
|-
| 40 || 1990 ||Podolsk|| Ketevan Arakhamia-Grant
|-
| 41 || 1991 ||Lvov|| Svetlana Matveeva
|-
| 42 || 1992 || ? || Svetlana Prudnikova
|-
| 43 || 1993 || Lipetsk || Ludmila Zaitseva
|-
| 44 || 1994 || Elista || Ekaterina Kovalevskaya
|-
| 45 || 1995 || Elista || Julia Demina 
|-
| 46 || 1996 || Elista || Ludmila Zaitseva 
|-
| 47 || 1997 || Elista || Alisa Galliamova 
|-
| 48 || 1998 || Elista || Svetlana Prudnikova 
|-
| 49 || 1999 || Moscow || Julia Demina 
|-
| 50 || 2000 || Elista || Ekaterina Kovalevskaya
|-
| 51 || 2001 || Elista || Olga Zimina 
|-
| 52 || 2002 || Elista || Tatiana Kosintseva 
|-
| 53 || 2003 || Elista || Irina Slavina Turova 
|-
| 54 || 2004 || Kazan || Tatiana Kosintseva 
|-
| 55 || 2005 || Samara || Alexandra Kosteniuk 
|-
| 56 || 2006 || Gorodets || Ekaterina Korbut 
|-
| 57 || 2007 || Moscow || Tatiana Kosintseva 
|-
| 58 || 2008 || Moscow || Nadezhda Kosintseva 
|-
| 59 || 2009 || Moscow || Alisa Galliamova
|-
| 60 || 2010 || Moscow || Alisa Galliamova  
|-
| 61 || 2011 || Moscow || Valentina Gunina  
|-
| 62 || 2012 || Moscow || Natalia Pogonina 
|-
| 63 || 2013 || Nizhny Novgorod || Valentina Gunina 
|-
| 64 || 2014 || Kazan || Valentina Gunina
|-
| 65 || 2015 || Chita || Aleksandra Goryachkina
|-
| 66 || 2016 || Novosibirsk || Alexandra Kosteniuk
|-
| 67 || 2017 || Saint Petersburg || Aleksandra Goryachkina
|-
| 68 || 2018 || Satka || Natalia Pogonina
|-
| 69 || 2019 || Votkinsk – Izhevsk || Olga Girya
|-
| 70 || 2020 || Moscow || Aleksandra Goryachkina
|-
| 71 || 2021 || Ufa || Valentina Gunina
|-
|72
|2022
|Cheboksary
|Valentina Gunina
|}

Events by year

1997

Men

Third place match: GM Alexey Dreev (2650) 1½:½ IM Alexander Lastin (2535)

1998

1999

Men

2000

2001

2002

2003

2004

Men
{| class="wikitable" style="text-align: center;"
|+57th Russian Championship Superfinal, 15–27 November 2004, Moscow, Category XVIII (2678)
! !! Player !! Rating !! 1 !! 2 !! 3 !! 4 !! 5 !! 6 !! 7 !! 8 !! 9 !! 10 !! 11 !! Total !! TPR !! Place
|-
|-style="background:#ccffcc;"
|1 ||align=left| ||2813 ||  ||½ ||1 ||½ ||½ ||1 ||1 ||½ ||½ ||1 ||1 ||7½ || 2857 ||1
|-
|2 ||align=left| ||2704 ||½ ||  ||½ ||½ ||1 ||½ ||1 ||½ ||0 ||½ ||1||6 || 2747 ||2
|-
|3 ||align=left| ||2698 ||0 ||½ ||  ||1 ||½ ||0 ||½ ||½ ||1 ||½ ||1 ||5½ || 2712 ||3
|-
|4 ||align=left| ||2758 ||½ ||½ ||0 ||  ||1 ||½ ||½ ||½ ||1 ||½ ||0||5 || 2670 ||4–7
|-
|5 ||align=left| ||2651 ||½ ||0 ||½ ||0 ||  ||1 ||½ ||1 ||0 ||½ ||1 ||5 || 2681 ||4–7
|-
|6 ||align=left| ||2735 ||0 ||½ ||1 ||½ ||0 ||  ||½ ||½ ||1 ||0 ||1 ||5 || 2672 ||4–7
|-
|7 ||align=left| ||2715 ||0 ||0 ||½ ||½ ||½ ||½ ||  ||½ ||1 ||½ ||1 ||5 || 2674 ||4–7
|-
|8 ||align=left| ||2599 ||½ ||½ ||½ ||½ ||0 ||½ ||½ ||  ||½ ||½ ||½ ||4½ || 2650 ||8–10
|-
|9 ||align=left| ||2596 ||½ ||1 ||0 ||0 ||1 ||0 ||0 ||½ ||  ||1 ||½ ||4½ || 2650 ||8–10
|-
|10 ||align=left| ||2611 ||0 ||½ ||½ ||½ ||½ ||1 ||½ ||½ ||0 ||  ||½ ||4½ || 2649 ||8–10
|-
|11 ||align=left| ||2577 ||0 ||0 ||0 ||1 ||0 ||0 ||0 ||½ ||½ ||½ ||  ||2½ || 2495 ||11
|}

Women
{| class="wikitable" style="text-align: center;"
|+54th Russian Women's Championship Superfinal, 29 June – 10 July 2004, Kazan, Category VII (2420)
! !! Player !! Rating !! 1 !! 2 !! 3 !! 4 !! 5 !! 6 !! 7 !! 8 !! 9 !! 10 !! 11 !! 12 !! Total !! TPR !! Place
|-
|-style="background:#ccffcc;"
| 1 ||align=left| || 2451 ||  || 1 || ½ || ½ || 1 || ½ || ½ || ½ || 1 || 1 || 1 || 1 ||8½ || 2628 ||1
|-
| 2 ||align=left| || 2469 || 0 ||  || ½ || ½ || 1 || 1 || ½ || 1 || 1 || 1 || ½ || 1 ||8 || 2590 ||2
|-
| 3 ||align=left| || 2425 || ½ || ½ ||  || ½ || 1 || 1 || 0 || 0 || 0 || 1 || 1 || 1 ||6½ || 2484 ||3
|-
| 4 ||align=left| || 2467 || ½ || ½ || ½ ||  || ½ || 0 || ½ || 1 || ½ || 1 || ½ || ½ ||6 || 2451 ||4–5
|-
| 5 ||align=left| || 2502 || 0 || 0 || 0 || ½ ||  || 1 || 1 || 1 || ½ || ½ || ½ || 1 ||6 || 2448 ||4–5
|-
| 6 ||align=left| || 2344 || ½ || 0 || 0 || 1 || 0 ||  || ½ || ½ || 1 || ½ || 1 || ½ ||5½ || 2426 ||6
|-
| 7 ||align=left| || 2380 || ½ || ½ || 1 || ½ || 0 || ½ ||  || 0 || 1 || 0 || ½ || ½ ||5 || 2387 ||7–8
|-
| 8 ||align=left| || 2395 || ½ || 0 || 1 || 0 || 0 || ½ || 1 ||  || ½ || ½ || 1 || 0 ||5 || 2386 ||7–8
|-
| 9 ||align=left| || 2406 || 0 || 0 || 1 || ½ || ½ || 0 || 0 || ½ ||  || ½ || 1 || ½ ||4½ || 2356 ||9
|-
| 10 ||align=left| || 2337 || 0 || 0 || 0 || 0 || ½ || ½ || 1 || ½ || ½ ||  || ½ || ½ ||4 || 2325 ||10
|-
| 11 ||align=left| || 2496 || 0 || ½ || 0 || ½ || ½ || 0 || ½ || 0 || 0 || ½ ||  || 1 ||3½ || 2280 ||11–12
|-
| 12 ||align=left| || 2362 || 0 || 0 || 0 || ½ || 0 || ½ || ½ || 1 || ½ || ½ || 0 ||  ||3½ || 2292 ||11–12
|}

2005

Men
{| class="wikitable" style="text-align: center;"
|+58th Russian Championship Superfinal, 19–30 December 2005, Moscow, Category XVII (2664)
! !! Player !! Rating !! 1 !! 2 !! 3 !! 4 !! 5 !! 6 !! 7 !! 8 !! 9 !! 10 !! 11 !! 12 !! Total !! TPR !! Place
|-
|-style="background:#ccffcc;"
|1 ||align=left| ||2652 ||  ||1 ||½ ||1 ||½ ||½ ||½ ||1 ||1 ||½ ||½ ||½ ||7½|| 2799 ||1
|-
|2 ||align=left| ||2644 ||0 ||  ||1 ||½ ||½ ||½ ||½ ||1 ||½ ||½ ||1 ||½ ||6½ || 2731 ||2–3
|-
|3 ||align=left| ||2707 ||½ ||0 ||  ||0 ||½ ||½ ||½ ||1 ||1 ||1 ||½ ||1 ||6½ || 2726 ||2–3
|-
|4 ||align=left| ||2675 ||0 ||½ ||1 ||  ||½ ||1 ||1 ||0 ||0 ||½ ||½ ||1 ||6 || 2699 ||4–6
|-
|5 ||align=left| ||2659 ||½ ||½ ||½ ||½ ||  ||½ ||½ ||½ ||½ ||1 ||0 ||1 ||6 || 2701 ||4–6
|-
|6 ||align=left| ||2740 ||½ ||½ ||½ ||0 ||½ ||  ||1 ||½ ||½ ||½ ||1 ||½||6 || 2694 ||4–6
|-
|7 ||align=left| ||2739 ||½ ||½ ||½ ||0 ||½ ||0 ||  ||½ ||½ ||½ ||1 ||1 ||5½ || 2658 ||7
|-
|8 ||align=left| ||2632 ||0 ||0 ||0 ||1 ||½ ||½ ||½ ||  ||½ ||½ ||½ ||1 ||5 || 2631 ||8
|-
|9 ||align=left| ||2694 ||0 ||½ ||0 ||1 ||½ ||½ ||½ ||½ ||  ||½ ||½ ||0 ||4½ || 2597 ||9–10
|-
|10 ||align=left| ||2653 ||½ ||½ ||0 ||½ ||0 ||½ ||½ ||½ ||½ ||  ||½ ||½ ||4½ || 2600 ||9–10
|-
|11 ||align=left| ||2564 ||½ ||0 ||½ ||½ ||1 ||0 ||0 ||½ ||½ ||½ ||  ||0 ||4 || 2572 ||11–12
|-
|12 ||align=left| ||2614 ||½ ||½ ||0 ||0 ||0 ||½ ||0 ||0 ||1 ||½ ||1 ||  ||4 || 2567 ||11–12
|}

Women
{| class="wikitable" style="text-align: center;"
|+55th Russian Women's Championship Superfinal, 14–26 May 2005, Samara, Category VI (2389)
! !! Player !! Rating !! 1 !! 2 !! 3 !! 4 !! 5 !! 6 !! 7 !! 8 !! 9 !! 10 !! 11 !! 12 !! Total !! TPR !! Place
|-
|-style="background:#ccffcc;"
| 1 ||align=left| || 2492 ||  || 1 || ½ || 1 || ½ || 1 || 1 || ½ || 1 || 1 || 1 || ½ ||9 || 2642 ||1
|-
| 2 ||align=left| || 2486 || 0 ||  || 1 || ½ || ½ || 1 || 1 || ½ || ½ || 1 || 1 || 1 ||8 || 2555 ||2
|-
| 3 ||align=left| || 2469 || ½ || 0 ||  || 1 || 1 || ½ || ½ || ½ || 1 || ½ || 1 || 1 ||7½ || 2515 ||3
|-
| 4 ||align=left| || 2459 || 0 || ½ || 0 ||  || 1 || ½ || 1 || 1 || 1 || 0 || ½ || 1 ||6½ || 2448 ||4
|-
| 5 ||align=left| || 2469 || ½ || ½ || 0 || 0 ||  || ½ || 0 || ½ || 1 || 1 || 1 || 1 ||6 || 2418 ||5
|-
| 6 ||align=left| || 2355 || 0 || 0 || ½ || ½ || ½ ||  || 1 || ½ || ½ || ½ || ½ || 1 ||5½ || 2392 ||6–7
|-
| 7 ||align=left| || 2423 || 0 || 0 || ½ || 0 || 1 || 0 ||  || 1 || ½ || 1 || ½ || 1 ||5½ || 2386 ||6–7
|-
| 8 ||align=left| || 2398 || ½ || ½ || ½ || 0 || ½ || ½ || 0 ||  || ½ || ½ || ½ || 1 ||5 || 2352 ||8
|-
| 9 ||align=left| || 2340 || 0 || ½ || 0 || 0 || 0 || ½ || ½ || ½ ||  || 1 || ½ || 1 ||4½ || 2329 ||9
|-
| 10 ||align=left| || 2399 || 0 || 0 || ½ || 1 || 0 || ½ || 0 || ½ || 0 ||  || 0 || 1 ||3½ || 2255 ||10–11
|-
| 11 ||align=left| || 2311 || 0 || 0 || 0 || ½ || 0 || ½ || ½ || ½ || ½ || 1 ||  || 0 ||3½ || 2263 ||10–11
|-
| 12 ||align=left| || 2068 || ½ || 0 || 0 || 0 || 0 || 0 || 0 || 0 || 0 || 0 || 1 ||  ||1½ || 2109 ||12
|}

2006

Men
{| class="wikitable" style="text-align: center;"
|+59th Russian Championship Superfinal, 3–15 December 2006, Moscow, Category XV (2622)
! !! Player !! Rating !! 1 !! 2 !! 3 !! 4 !! 5 !! 6 !! 7 !! 8 !! 9 !! 10 !! 11 !! 12 !! Total !! TB !! TPR !! Place
|-
|-style="background:#ccffcc;"
|1 ||align=left| ||2639 ||  ||½ ||½ ||½ ||0 ||½ ||1 ||1 ||½ ||1 ||1 ||1 ||7½ || 1½ || 2754 ||1
|-
|2 ||align=left| ||2671 ||½ ||  ||1 ||½ ||½ ||0 ||1 ||½ ||1 ||½ ||1 ||1 ||7½ || ½ || 2751 ||2
|-
|3 ||align=left| ||2628 ||½ ||0 ||  ||½ ||½ ||1 ||0 ||½ ||1 ||1 ||1 ||1 ||7 || || 2724 ||3
|-
|4 ||align=left| ||2750 ||½ ||½ ||½ ||  ||½ ||½ ||½ ||½ ||1 ||1 ||½ ||½ ||6½ || || 2676 ||4
|-
|5 ||align=left| ||2688 ||1 ||½ ||½ ||½ ||  ||½ ||½ ||½ ||0 ||½ ||½ ||½ ||5½ || || 2616 ||5–7
|-
|6 ||align=left| ||2543 ||½ ||1 ||0 ||½ ||½ ||  ||½ ||½ ||1 ||0 ||½ ||½ ||5½ || || 2630 ||5–7
|-
|7 ||align=left| ||2595 ||0 ||0 ||1 ||½ ||½ ||½ ||  ||1 ||½ ||½ ||½ ||½ ||5½ || || 2625 ||5–7
|-
|8 ||align=left| ||2582 ||0 ||½ ||½ ||½ ||½ ||½ ||0 ||  ||½ ||½ ||½ ||1 ||5 || || 2590 ||8–10
|-
|9 ||align=left| ||2545 ||½ ||0 ||0 ||0 ||1 ||0 ||½ ||½ ||  ||1 ||½ ||1 ||5 || || 2593 ||8–10
|-
|10 ||align=left| ||2583 ||0 ||½ ||0 ||0 ||½ ||1 ||½ ||½ ||0 ||  ||1 ||1 ||5 || || 2590 ||8–10
|-
|11 ||align=left| ||2596 ||0 ||0 ||0 ||½ ||½ ||½ ||½ ||½ ||½ ||0 ||  ||½ ||3½ || || 2492 ||11
|-
|12 ||align=left| ||2648 ||0 ||0 ||0 ||½ ||½ ||½ ||½ ||0 ||0 ||0 ||½ ||  ||2½ || || 2409 ||12
|}

First-place tiebreak

{| class="wikitable" style="text-align: center;"
! Player !! Rating !! colspan="2" | Rapid chess !! Place
|-
| align=left| || 2639 || ½ || 1 || 1
|-
| align=left| || 2671 || ½ || 0 || 2
|}

Women
{| class="wikitable" style="text-align: center;"
|+56th Russian Women's Championship Superfinal, 1–12 December 2006, Gorodets, Category VII (2407)
! !! Player !! Rating !! 1 !! 2 !! 3 !! 4 !! 5 !! 6 !! 7 !! 8 !! 9 !! 10 !! 11 !! 12 !! Total !! SB !! TPR
|-
|-style="background:#ccffcc;"
| 1 ||align=left| || 2435 ||  || 0 || 1 || 1 || ½ || 1 || ½ || 0 || 1 || 1 || 1 || 1 ||8 || || 2579
|-
| 2 ||align=left| || 2415 || 1 ||  || ½ || ½ || ½ || ½ || 0 || 1 || 1 || 1 || 1 || ½ ||7½ || 37.50 || 2539
|-
| 3 ||align=left| || 2458 || 0 || ½ ||  || ½ || ½ || 1 || 1 || 1 || 1 || 1 || 0 || 1 ||7½ || 37.00 || 2535
|-
| 4 ||align=left| || 2493 || 0 || ½ || ½ ||  || 0 || 1 || 1 || 1 || ½ || 1 || 1 || 1 ||7½ || 34.25 || 2532
|-
| 5 ||align=left| || 2434 || ½ || ½ || ½ || 1 ||  || 0 || ½ || 1 || ½ || ½ || 1 || 1 ||7 ||  || 2507
|-
| 6 ||align=left| || 2470 || 0 || ½ || 0 || 0 || 1 ||  || ½ || 1 || ½ || 1 || 1 || 1 ||6½ ||  || 2466
|-
| 7 ||align=left| || 2396 || ½ || 1 || 0 || 0 || ½ || ½ ||  || 0 || ½ || 1 || ½ || 1 ||5½ || || 2408
|-
| 8 ||align=left| || 2395 || 1 || 0 || 0 || 0 || 0 || 0 || 1 ||  || 1 || 0 || 1 || ½ ||4½ || || 2343
|-
| 9 ||align=left| || 2415 || 0 || 0 || 0 || ½ || ½ || ½ || ½ || 0 ||  || 1 || 0 || ½ ||3½ || 18.00 || 2273
|-
| 10 ||align=left| || 2255 || 0 || 0 || 0 || 0 || ½ || 0 || 0 || 1 || 0 ||  || 1 || 1 ||3½ || 13.00 || 2288
|-
| 11 ||align=left| || 2392 || 0 || 0 || 1 || 0 || 0 || 0 || ½ || 0 || 1 || 0 ||  || 0 ||2½ || 13.75 || 2197
|-
| 12 ||align=left| || 2326 || 0 || ½ || 0 || 0 || 0 || 0 || 0 || ½ || ½ || 0 || 1 ||  ||2½ || 10.25 || 2203
|}

2007

Men
{| class="wikitable" style="text-align: center;"
|+60th Russian Championship Superfinal, 18–30 December 2007, Moscow, Category XVII (2656)
! !! Player !! Rating !! 1 !! 2 !! 3 !! 4 !! 5 !! 6 !! 7 !! 8 !! 9 !! 10 !! 11 !! 12 !! Total !! SB !!  !! TPR
|-
|-style="background:#ccffcc;"
| 1 || align=left| || 2755 ||  || 1 || 1 || 0 || 1 || 0 || 1 || ½ || 1 || ½ || 1 || 1 ||8 || || || 2822
|-
| 2 || align=left| || 2715 || 0 ||  || 1 || ½ || ½ || ½ || ½ || ½ || ½ || 1 || 1 || 1 ||7 || || || 2752
|-
| 3 || align=left| || 2646 || 0 || 0 ||  || ½ || 0 || 1 || 1 || ½ || 1 || 1 || ½ || 1 ||6½ || || || 2722
|-
| 4 || align=left| || 2607 || 1 || ½ || ½ ||  || 1 || ½ || 0 || 1 || 0 || 0 || ½ || ½ ||5½ || 32.25 || || 2660
|-
| 5 || align=left| || 2674 || 0 || ½ || 1 || 0 ||  || 1 || ½ || ½ || ½ || ½ || ½ || ½ ||5½ || 29.50 || 1 || 2654
|-
| 6 || align=left| || 2594 || 1 || ½ || 0 || ½ || 0 ||  || ½ || ½ || 0 || ½ || 1 || 1 ||5½ || 29.50 || 0 || 2661
|-
| 7 || align=left| || 2634 || 0 || ½ || 0 || 1 || ½ || ½ ||  || 1 || ½ || 1 || ½ || 0 ||5½ || 29.00 || || 2658
|-
| 8 || align=left| || 2710 || ½ || ½ || ½ || 0 || ½ || ½ || 0 ||  || ½ || 1 || ½ || 1 ||5½ || 28.75 || || 2651
|-
| 9 || align=left| || 2732 || 0 || ½ || 0 || 1 || ½ || 1 || ½ || ½ ||  || ½ || 0 || ½ ||5 || || || 2613
|-
| 10 || align=left| || 2637 || ½ || 0 || 0 || 1 || ½ || ½ || 0 || 0 || ½ ||  || ½ || 1 ||4½ || || || 2592
|-
| 11 || align=left| || 2528 || 0 || 0 || ½ || ½ || ½ || 0 || ½ || ½ || 1 || ½ ||  || 0 ||4 || || || 2565
|-
| 12 || align=left| || 2637 || 0 || 0 || 0 || ½ || ½ || 0 || 1 || 0 || ½ || 0 || 1 ||  ||3½ || || || 2524
|}

Women
{| class="wikitable" style="text-align: center;"
|+57th Russian Women's Championship Superfinal, 18–30 December 2007, Moscow, Category VII (2413)
! !! Player !! Rating !! 1 !! 2 !! 3 !! 4 !! 5 !! 6 !! 7 !! 8 !! 9 !! 10 !! 11 !! 12 !! Total !! SB !! TPR
|-
|-style="background:#ccffcc;"
| 1 || align=left| || 2469 ||  || 1 || ½ || ½ || 1 || ½ || ½ || 1 || 0 || 1 || 1 || 0 ||7 || 38.75 || 2510
|-
| 2 || align=left| || 2391 || 0 ||  || 1 || ½ || 1 || 1 || ½ || 1 || 0 || 1 || 0 || 1 ||7 || 37.25 || 2517
|-
| 3 || align=left| || 2386 || ½ || 0 ||  || 1 || ½ || ½ || ½ || 1 || ½ || 1 || ½ || 1 ||7 || 35.50 || 2517
|-
| 4 || align=left| || 2443 || ½ || ½ || 0 ||  || 0 || ½ || ½ || 1 || 1 || 1 || 1 || 1 ||7 || 33.25 || 2512
|-
| 5 || align=left| || 2462 || 0 || 0 || ½ || 1 ||  || ½ || 1 || ½ || ½ || 1 || 1 || 0 ||6 || 31.75 || 2444
|-
| 6 || align=left| || 2469 || ½ || 0 || ½ || ½ || ½ ||  || 0 || ½ || ½ || 1 || 1 || 1 ||6 || 28.75 || 2444
|-
| 7 || align=left| || 2434 || ½ || ½ || ½ || ½ || 0 || 1 ||  || 0 || 1 || 0 || ½ || 1 ||5½ || 29.25 || 2411
|-
| 8 || align=left| || 2379 || 0 || 0 || 0 || 0 || ½ || ½ || 1 ||  || 1 || ½ || 1 || 1 ||5½ || 24.50 || 2416
|-
| 9 || align=left| || 2375 || 1 || 1 || ½ || 0 || ½ || ½ || 0 || 0 ||  || ½ || 0 || 1 ||5 || || 2380
|-
| 10 || align=left| || 2338 || 0 || 0 || 0 || 0 || 0 || 0 || 1 || ½ || ½ ||  || 1 || 1 ||4 || || 2318
|-
| 11 || align=left| || 2448 || 0 || 1 || ½ || 0 || 0 || 0 || ½ || 0 || 1 || 0 ||  || ½ ||3½ || || 2277
|-
| 12 || align=left| || 2359 || 1 || 0 || 0 || 0 || 1 || 0 || 0 || 0 || 0 || 0 || ½ ||  ||2½ || || 2207
|}

2008

Men
{| class="wikitable" style="text-align: center;"
|+61st Russian Championship Superfinal, 3–15 October 2008, Moscow, Category XVII (2673)
! !! Player !! Rating !! 1 !! 2 !! 3 !! 4 !! 5 !! 6 !! 7 !! 8 !! 9 !! 10 !! 11 !! 12 !! Total !! TB !! TPR !! Place
|-
|-style="background:#ccffcc;"
| 1 || align=left| || 2727 ||  || ½ || 1 || 1 || ½ || ½ || 0 || ½ || 1 || ½ || 1 || ½ ||7 || 3 || 2770 ||1
|-
| 2 || align=left| || 2737 || ½ ||  || 1 || 0 || ½ || 1 || ½ || 1 || ½ || 1 || ½ || ½ ||7 || 2½ || 2770 ||2
|-
| 3 || align=left| || 2715 || 0 || 0 ||  || ½ || ½ || ½ || 1 || ½ || 1 || 1 || 1 || 1 ||7 || ½ || 2772 ||3
|-
| 4 || align=left| || 2787 || 0 || 1 || ½ ||  || 0 || ½ || ½ || ½ || ½ || 1 || 1 || 1 ||6½ || || 2728 ||4–6
|-
| 5 || align=left| || 2646 || ½ || ½ || ½ || 1 ||  || ½ || 1 || 0 || ½ || ½ || 1 || ½ ||6½ || || 2741 ||4–6
|-
| 6 || align=left| || 2638 || ½ || 0 || ½ || ½ || ½ ||  || 1 || 1 || 1 || ½ || ½ || ½ ||6½ || || 2742 ||4–6
|-
| 7 || align=left| || 2670 || 1 || ½ || 0 || ½ || 0 || 0 ||  || ½ || 1 || ½ || 1 || 1 ||6 || || 2710 ||7
|-
| 8 || align=left| || 2651 || ½ || 0 || ½ || ½ || 1 || 0 || ½ ||  || 0 || ½ || ½ || 1 ||5 || || 2639 ||8
|-
| 9 || align=left| || 2669 || 0 || ½ || 0 || ½ || ½ || 0 || 0 || 1 ||  || ½ || ½ || ½ ||4 || || 2572 ||9–10
|-
| 10 || align=left| || 2640 || ½ || 0 || 0 || 0 || ½ || ½ || ½ || ½ || ½ ||  || ½ || ½ ||4 || || 2574 ||9–10
|-
| 11 || align=left| || 2656 || 0 || ½ || 0 || 0 || 0 || ½ || 0 || ½ || ½ || ½ ||  || 1 ||3½ || || 2542 ||11
|-
| 12 || align=left| || 2544 || ½ || ½ || 0 || 0 || ½ || ½ || 0 || 0 || ½ || ½ || 0 ||  ||3 || || 2510 ||12
|}

Rapid playoff
{| class="wikitable" style="text-align: center;"
|+Rapid chess tiebreak, 28 October 2008, Moscow
! !! Player !! Rating !! 1 !! 2 !! 3 !! Total
|-
| 1 || align=left| || 2727 ||  || ½ 1 || 1 ½ ||3
|-
| 2 || align=left| || 2737 || ½ 0 ||  || 1 1 ||2½
|-
| 3 || align=left| || 2715 || 0 ½ || 0 0 ||  ||½
|}

Women
{| class="wikitable" style="text-align: center;"
|+58th Russian Women's Championship Superfinal, 4–14 December 2008, Moscow, Category VIII (2432)
! !! Player !! Rating !! 1 !! 2 !! 3 !! 4 !! 5 !! 6 !! 7 !! 8 !! 9 !! 10 !! Total !! TPR
|-
|-style="background:#ccffcc;"
| 1 || align=left| || 2468 ||  || ½ || ½ || ½ || 1 || 0 || 1 || 1 || 1 || 1 ||6½ || 2594
|-
| 2 || align=left| || 2513 || ½ ||  || ½ || 1 || 0 || 1 || 1 || ½ || 0 || 1 ||5½ || 2503
|-
| 3 || align=left| || 2381 || ½ || ½ ||  || ½ || ½ || 1 || ½ || ½ || ½ || 1 ||5½ || 2517
|-
| 4 || align=left| || 2398 || ½ || 0 || ½ ||  || 0 || 1 || 1 || ½ || 1 || 0 ||4½ || 2436
|-
| 5 || align=left|  || 2429 || 0 || 1 || ½ || 1 ||  || 0 || 0 || ½ || ½ || 1 ||4½ || 2432
|-
| 6 || align=left| || 2459 || 1 || 0 || 0 || 0 || 1 ||  || ½ || 0 || ½ || 1 ||4 || 2386
|-
| 7 || align=left| || 2474 || 0 || 0 || ½ || 0 || 1 || ½ ||  || 1 || 1 || 0 ||4 || 2384
|-
| 8 || align=left| || 2381 || 0 || ½ || ½ || ½ || ½ || 1 || 0 ||  || ½ || ½ ||4 || 2394
|-
| 9 || align=left| || 2429 || 0 || 1 || ½ || 0 || ½ || ½ || 0 || ½ ||  || 1 ||4 || 2389
|-
| 10 || align=left| || 2386 || 0 || 0 || 0 || 1 || 0 || 0 || 1 || ½ || 0 ||  ||2½ || 2271
|}

2009

Men
{| class="wikitable" style="text-align: center;"
|+62nd Russian Championship Superfinal, 19–30 December 2009, Moscow, Cat. XVIII (2691)
! !! Player !! Rating !! 1 !! 2 !! 3 !! 4 !! 5 !! 6 !! 7 !! 8 !! 9 !! 10 !! Total !! TPR
|-
|-style="background:#ccffcc;"
| 1 || align=left| || 2736 ||  || ½ || ½ || ½ || 1 || ½ || 1 || 1 || ½ || 1 ||6½ || 2852
|-
| 2 || align=left| || 2754 || ½ ||  || ½ || ½ || ½ || 1 || 1 || 1 || 1 || 0 ||6 || 2809
|-
| 3 || align=left| || 2694 || ½ || ½ ||  || ½ || 1 || 1 || 0 || ½ || 1 || 0 ||5 || 2734
|-
| 4 || align=left| || 2715 || ½ || ½ || ½ ||  || 0 || ½ || 1 || ½ || ½ || ½ ||4½ || 2688
|-
| 5 || align=left| || 2736 || 0 || ½ || 0 || 1 ||  || ½ || ½ || ½ || ½ || 1 ||4½ || 2686
|-
| 6 || align=left| || 2643 || ½ || 0 || 0 || ½ || ½ ||  || 1 || ½ || 0 || 1 ||4 || 2653
|-
| 7 || align=left| || 2661 || 0 || 0 || 1 || 0 || ½ || 0 ||  || ½ || 1 || 1 ||4 || 2651
|-
| 8 || align=left| || 2708 || 0 || 0 || ½ || ½ || ½ || ½ || ½ ||  || ½ || 1 ||4 || 2646
|-
| 9 || align=left| || 2651 || ½ || 0 || 0 || ½ || ½ || 1 || 0 || ½ ||  || ½ ||3½ || 2615
|-
| 10 || align=left| || 2612 || 0 || 1 || 1 || ½ || 0 || 0 || 0 || 0 || ½ ||  ||3 || 2575
|}

Women
{| class="wikitable" style="text-align: center;"
|+59th Russian Women's Championship Superfinal, 19–30 December 2009, Moscow, Cat. VIII (2439)
! !! Player !! Rating !! 1 !! 2 !! 3 !! 4 !! 5 !! 6 !! 7 !! 8 !! 9 !! 10 !! Total !! TPR
|-
|-style="background:#ccffcc;"
| 1 || align=left| || 2460 ||  || ½ || ½ || ½ || 1 || 1 || 1 || 1 || 1 || 1 ||7½ || 2709
|-
| 2 || align=left| || 2518 || ½ ||  || 1 || ½ || 1 || 1 || ½ || 1 || ½ || 1 ||7 || 2650
|-
| 3 || align=left| || 2446 || ½ || 0 ||  || ½ || 0 || 1 || 1 || 1 || 1 || 1 ||6 || 2563
|-
| 4 || align=left| || 2522 || ½ || ½ || ½ ||  || 1 || 0 || 1 || 1 || ½ || ½ ||5½ || 2509
|-
| 5 || align=left| || 2390 || 0 || 0 || 1 || 0 ||  || ½ || + || 1 || 1 || 0 ||4½ || 2394
|-
| 6 || align=left| || 2372 || 0 || 0 || 0 || 1 || ½ ||  || 0 || 1 || 1 || 1 ||4½ || 2446
|-
| 7 || align=left| || 2501 || 0 || ½ || 0 || 0 || − || 1 ||  || − || 1 || 1 ||3½ || 2444
|-
| 8 || align=left| || 2384 || 0 || 0 || 0 || 0 || 0 || 0 || + ||  || 1 || 1 ||3 || 2245
|-
| 9 || align=left| || 2344 || 0 || ½ || 0 || ½ || 0 || 0 || 0 || 0 ||  || 1 ||2 || 2229
|-
| 10 || align=left| || 2449 || 0 || 0 || 0 || ½ || 1 || 0 || 0 || 0 || 0 ||  ||1½ || 2164
|}

2010

Men
{| class="wikitable" style="text-align: center;"
|+63rd Russian Championship Superfinal, 11–22 December 2010, Moscow, Category XIX (2706)
! !! Player !! Rating !! 1 !! 2 !! 3 !! 4 !! 5 !! 6 !! 7 !! 8 !! 9 !! 10 !! 11 !! 12 !! Total !! TPR !! Place
|-
|-style="background:#ccffcc;"
| 1 || align=left| || 2720 ||  || 0 || ½ || 1 || ½ || ½ || ½ || ½ || ½ || 1 || 1 || 1 ||7 || 2807 ||1
|-
| 2 || align=left| || 2760 || 1 ||  || ½ || ½ || 0 || ½ || ½ || ½ || 1 || 1 || ½ || 1 ||7 || 2803 ||2
|-
| 3 || align=left| || 2771 || ½ || ½ ||  || ½ || 1 || 1 || ½ || ½ || ½ || ½ || ½ || ½ ||6½ || 2765 ||3
|-
| 4 || align=left| || 2722 || 0 || ½ || ½ ||  || 1 || ½ || ½ || ½ || 1 || ½ || 1 || ½ ||6½ || 2770 ||4
|-
| 5 || align=left| || 2712 || ½ || 1 || 0 || 0 ||  || 1 || ½ || ½ || ½ || ½ || ½ || ½ ||5½ || 2706 ||5
|-
| 6 || align=left| || 2709 || ½ || ½ || 0 || ½ || 0 ||  || ½ || ½ || ½ || ½ || 1 || 1 ||5½ || 2706 ||6
|-
| 7 || align=left| || 2726 || ½ || ½ || ½ || ½ || ½ || ½ ||  || ½ || 0 || ½ || ½ || ½ ||5 || 2669 ||7–8
|-
| 8 || align=left| || 2646 || ½ || ½ || ½ || ½ || ½ || ½ || ½ ||  || ½ || 0 || ½ || ½ ||5 || 2676 ||7–8
|-
| 9 || align=left| || 2676 || ½ || 0 || ½ || 0 || ½ || ½ || 1 || ½ ||  || ½ || ½ || ½ ||5 || 2673 ||9
|-
| 10 || align=left| || 2699 || 0 || 0 || ½ || ½ || ½ || ½ || ½ || 1 || ½ ||  || ½ || ½ ||5 || 2671 ||10
|-
| 11 || align=left| || 2659 || 0 || ½ || ½ || 0 || ½ || 0 || ½ || ½ || ½ || ½ ||  || ½ ||4 || 2609 ||11
|-
| 12 || align=left| || 2676 || 0 || 0 || ½ || ½ || ½ || 0 || ½ || ½ || ½ || ½ || ½ ||  ||4 || 2607 ||12
|}

First-place tiebreak
{| class="wikitable" style="text-align: center;"
! Player !! Rating !! colspan="2" | Rapid chess !! Armageddon !! Place
|-
| align=left| 
|| 2720 
| style="background: black; color: white" | ½ 
| style="background: white; color: black" | ½ 
| style="background: black; color: white" | ½ 
|| 1
|-
| align=left| 
|| 2760 
| style="background: white; color: black" | ½ 
| style="background: black; color: white" | ½ 
| style="background: white; color: black" | ½ 
|| 2
|}

Women
{| class="wikitable" style="text-align: center;"
|+60th Russian Women's Championship Superfinal, 16–27 November 2010, Moscow, Category IX (2458)
! !! Player !! Rating !! 1 !! 2 !! 3 !! 4 !! 5 !! 6 !! 7 !! 8 !! 9 !! 10 !! 11 !! 12 !! Total !! TPR
|-
|-style="background:#ccffcc;"
| 1 || align=left| || 2487 ||  || ½ || ½ || 1 || 1 || 0 || 1 || 0 || 1 || 1 || 0 || 1 ||7 || 2557
|-
| 2 || align=left| || 2472 || ½ ||  || ½ || 1 || ½ || 0 || ½ || 1 || 1 || 1 || ½ || ½ ||7 || 2559
|-
| 3 || align=left| || 2581 || ½ || ½ ||  || 0 || 1 || ½ || ½ || ½ || 1 || ½ || 1 || 1 ||7 || 2549
|-
| 4 || align=left| || 2401 || 0 || 0 || 1 ||  || 1 || 1 || ½ || 1 || 0 || 1 || ½ || ½ ||6½ || 2528
|-
| 5 || align=left| || 2507 || 0 || ½ || 0 || 0 ||  || 1 || 1 || 1 || ½ || ½ || 1 || 0 ||5½ || 2453
|-
| 6 || align=left| || 2479 || 1 || 1 || ½ || 0 || 0 ||  || 0 || 0 || 0 || 1 || ½ || 1 ||5 || 2420
|-
| 7 || align=left| || 2576 || 0 || ½ || ½ || ½ || 0 || 1 ||  || 1 || 1 || 0 || ½ || 0 ||5 || 2411
|-
| 8 || align=left| || 2384 || 1 || 0 || ½ || 0 || 0 || 1 || 0 ||  || 0 || 1 || 1 || ½ ||5 || 2429
|-
| 9 || align=left| || 2377 || 0 || 0 || 0 || 1 || ½ || 1 || 0 || 1 ||  || 0 || ½ || 1 ||5 || 2429
|-
| 10 || align=left| || 2407 || 0 || 0 || ½ || 0 || ½ || 0 || 1 || 0 || 1 ||  || 1 || 1 ||5 || 2427
|-
| 11 || align=left| || 2435 || 1 || ½ || 0 || ½ || 0 || ½ || ½ || 0 || ½ || 0 ||  || 1 ||4½ || 2395
|-
| 12 || align=left| || 2389 || 0 || ½ || 0 || ½ || 1 || 0 || 1 || ½ || 0 || 0 || 0 ||  ||3½  || 2331
|}

First-place tiebreak
{| class="wikitable" style="text-align: center;"
! Player !! Rating !! colspan="2" | Rapid chess !! Place
|-
| align=left|
|| 2487
| style="background: white; color: black" | ½
| style="background: black; color: white" | 1 
|| 1
|-
| align=left|
|| 2472 
| style="background: black; color: white" | ½
| style="background: white; color: black" | 0 
|| 2
|}

2011

Men
{| class="wikitable" style="text-align: center;"
|+64th Russian Championship Superfinal, 8–15 August 2011, Moscow, Category XIX (2715)
! !! Player !! Rating !! 1 !! 2 !! 3 !! 4 !! 5 !! 6 !! 7 !! 8 !! Total !! SB !!  !! TPR
|-
|-style="background:#ccffcc;"
| 1 || align=left| || 2739 ||  || 0 || ½ || ½ || 1 || 1 || 1 || 1 ||5 ||  || || 2869
|-
| 2 || align=left| || 2694 || 1 ||  || 1 || ½ || ½ || 0 || ½ || 1 ||4½ ||  || || 2820
|-
| 3 || align=left| || 2746 || ½ || 0 ||  || 1 || ½ || ½ || 1 || ½ ||4 || 12.75 || 1 || 2760
|-
| 4 || align=left| || 2788 || ½ || ½ || 0 ||  || 1 || ½ || ½ || 1 ||4 || 12.75 || 0 || 2754
|-
| 5 || align=left| || 2781 || 0 || ½ || ½ || 0 ||  || 1 || 1 || 1 ||4 || 10.75 ||  || 2755
|-
| 6 || align=left| || 2711 || 0 || 1 || ½ || ½ || 0 ||  || ½ || ½ ||3 ||  || || 2665
|-
| 7 || align=left| || 2598 || 0 || ½ || 0 || ½ || 0 || ½ ||  || ½ ||2 || || || 2574
|-
| 8 || align=left| || 2665 || 0 || 0 || ½ || 0 || 0 || ½ || ½ ||  ||1½ || || || 2492
|}

Women
{| class="wikitable" style="text-align: center;"
|+61st Russian Women's Championship Superfinal, 19–28 August 2011, Moscow, Category VII (2418)
! !! Player !! Rating !! 1 !! 2 !! 3 !! 4 !! 5 !! 6 !! 7 !! 8 !! 9 !! 10 !! Total !! SB !! TPR
|-
|-style="background:#ccffcc;"
| 1 || align=left| || 2487 ||  || 0 || 1 || ½ || ½ || 1 || 1 || 1 || ½ || 1 ||6½ || || 2576
|-
| 2 || align=left| || 2492 || 1 ||  || 1 || 0 || ½ || 1 || 0 || 1 || ½ || ½ ||5½ || 25.25 || 2489
|-
| 3 || align=left| || 2310 || 0 || 0 ||  || 1 || 1 || 1 || ½ || 0 || 1 || 1 ||5½ || 22.00 || 2510
|-
| 4 || align=left| || 2442 || ½ || 1 || 0 ||  || ½ || 0 || 1 || 1 || 1 || 0 ||5 || 22.25 || 2458
|-
| 5 || align=left| || 2354 || ½ || ½ || 0 || ½ ||  || 1 || ½ || 0 || 1 || 1 ||5 || 20.50 || 2468  
|-
| 6 || align=left| || 2419 || 0 || 0 || 0 || 1 || 0 ||  || 1 || 1 || ½ || 1 ||4½ ||  || 2417
|-
| 7 || align=left| || 2497 || 0 || 1 || ½ || 0 || ½ || 0 ||  || 1 || ½ || ½ ||4 ||  || 2366
|-
| 8 || align=left| || 2373 || 0 || 0 || 1 || 0 || 1 || 0 || 0 ||  || ½ || 1 ||3½ || 14.25 || 2343
|-
| 9 || align=left| || 2371 || ½ || ½ || 0 || 0 || 0 || ½ || ½ || ½ ||  || 1 ||3½ || 14.00 || 2343
|-
| 10 || align=left| || 2431 || 0 || ½ || 0 || 1 || 0 || 0 || ½ || 0 || 0 ||  ||2 ||  || 2196
|}

2012

Men
{| class="wikitable" style="text-align: center;"
|+65th Russian Championship Superfinal, 3–12 August 2012, Moscow, Category XVIII (2699)
! !! Player !! Rating !! 1 !! 2 !! 3 !! 4 !! 5 !! 6 !! 7 !! 8 !! 9 !! 10 !! Total !! TB !! SB !! TPR
|-
|-style="background:#ccffcc;"
| 1 || align=left| || 2715 ||  || ½ || ½ || ½ || 1 || ½ || 0 || ½ || ½ || 1 ||5 || 4 || || 2740
|-
| 2 || align=left| || 2785 || ½ ||  || ½ || ½ || ½ || 1 || ½ || ½ || ½ || ½ ||5 || 3½ || || 2733
|-
| 3 || align=left| || 2749 || ½ || ½ ||  || ½ || ½ || ½ || 1 || ½ || ½ || ½ ||5 || 3 || || 2737
|-
| 4 || align=left| || 2722 || ½ || ½ || ½ ||  || ½ || ½ || ½ || ½ || ½ || 1 ||5 || 2½ || || 2740
|-
| 5 || align=left| || 2651 || 0 || ½ || ½ || ½ ||  || ½ || ½ || ½ || 1 || 1 ||5 || 1½ ||  || 2748
|-
| 6 || align=left| || 2673 || ½ || 0 || ½ || ½ || ½ ||  || ½ || ½ || 1 || 1 ||5 || ½ || || 2745
|-
| 7 || align=left| || 2763 || 1 || ½ || 0 || ½ || ½ || ½ ||  || ½ || ½ || ½ ||4½ || || || 2692
|-
| 8 || align=left| || 2594 || ½ || ½ || ½ || ½ || ½ || ½ || ½ ||  || 0 || ½ ||4 || || 18.50 || 2668
|-
| 9 || align=left| || 2705 || ½ || ½ || ½ || ½ || 0 || 0 || ½ || 1 ||  || ½ ||4 || || 17.50 || 2656
|-
| 10 || align=left| || 2635 || 0 || ½ || ½ || 0 || 0 || 0 || ½ || ½ || ½ ||  ||2½ || ||  || 2540
|}

Rapid playoff
{| class="wikitable" style="text-align: center;"
! !! Player !! Rapid rating !! 1 !! 2 !! 3 !! 4 !! 5 !! 6 !! Total
|-
| 1 || align=left| || 2723 ||  || ½ || 1 || 1 || ½ || 1 ||4
|-
| 2 || align=left| || 2830 || ½ ||  || ½ || ½ || 1 || 1 ||3½
|-
| 3 || align=left| || 2733 || 0 || ½ ||  || 1 || ½ || 1 ||3
|-
| 4 || align=left| || 2714 || 0 || ½ || 0 ||  || 1 || 1 ||2½
|-
| 5 || align=left| || 2651 || ½ || 0 || ½ || 0 ||  || ½ ||1½
|-
| 6 || align=left| || 2685 || 0 || 0 || 0 || 0 || ½ ||  ||½
|}

Women
{| class="wikitable" style="text-align: center;"
|+62nd Russian Women's Championship Superfinal, 3–12 August 2012, Moscow, Category VIII (2445)
! !! Player !! Rating !! 1 !! 2 !! 3 !! 4 !! 5 !! 6 !! 7 !! 8 !! 9 !! 10 !! Total !! SB !! TPR
|-
|-style="background:#ccffcc;"
| 1 || align=left| || 2448 ||  || 1 || ½ || ½ || 1 || 1 || ½ || ½ || ½ || 1 ||6½ ||  || 2611
|-
| 2 || align=left| || 2507 || 0 ||  || 1 || 1 || 1 || ½ || ½ || ½ || 0 || 1 ||5½ || 23.25 || 2519
|-
| 3 || align=left| || 2524 || ½ || 0 ||  || 1 || ½ || ½ || ½ || ½ || 1 || 1 ||5½ || 21.50 || 2517
|-
| 4 || align=left| || 2465 || ½ || 0 || 0 ||  || ½ || 1 || 1 || ½ || ½ || 1 ||5 || 19.75 || 2486
|-
| 5 || align=left| || 2530 || 0 || 0 || ½ || ½ ||  || 1 || 0 || 1 || 1 || 1 ||5 || 18.25 || 2479  
|-
| 6 || align=left| || 2433 || 0 || ½ || ½ || 0 || 0 ||  || 1 || 1 || 1 || 1 ||5 || 18.00 || 2490
|-
| 7 || align=left| || 2353 || ½ || ½ || ½ || 0 || 1 || 0 ||  || 1 || 1 || 0 ||4½ ||  || 2456
|-
| 8 || align=left| || 2408 || ½ || ½ || ½ || ½ || 0 || 0 || 0 ||  || 1 || 1 ||4 ||  || 2407
|-
| 9 || align=left| || 2367 || ½ || 1 || 0 || ½ || 0 || 0 || 0 || 0 ||  || 1 ||3 ||  || 2329
|-
| 10 || align=left| || 2419 || 0 || 0 || 0 || 0 || 0 || 0 || 1 || 0 || 0 ||  ||1 ||  || 2097
|}

2013

Men
{| class="wikitable" style="text-align: center;"
|+66th Russian Championship Superfinal, 5–14 October 2013, Nizhny Novgorod, Category XVIII (2696)
! !! Player !! Rating !! 1 !! 2 !! 3 !! 4 !! 5 !! 6 !! 7 !! 8 !! 9 !! 10 !! Total !! TB !! SB !! TPR
|-
|-style="background:#ccffcc;"
| 1 || align=left| || 2740 ||  || 1 || ½ || ½ || 1 || ½ || ½ || ½ || 1 || 1 ||6½ || 1½ ||  || 2857
|-
| 2 || align=left| || 2702 || 0 ||  || 1 || 1 || 1 || ½ || 1 || ½ || ½ || 1 ||6½ || ½ ||  || 2861
|-
| 3 || align=left| || 2729 || ½ || 0 ||  || ½ || 1 || ½ || ½ || 1 || 1 || ½ ||5½ || || 22.00 || 2772
|-
| 4 || align=left| || 2796 || ½ || 0 || ½ ||  || 0 || ½ || 1 || 1 || 1 || 1 ||5½ || || 19.75 || 2765
|-
| 5 || align=left| || 2706 || 0 || 0 || 0 || 1 ||  || 1 || ½ || 1 || ½ || 1 ||5 || ||  || 2738
|-
| 6 || align=left| || 2762 || ½ || ½ || ½ || ½ || 0 ||  || ½ || ½ || ½ || 1 ||4½ || || 18.25 || 2689
|-
| 7 || align=left| || 2695 || ½ || 0 || ½ || 0 || ½ || ½ ||  || 1 || 1 || ½ ||4½ || || 17.25 || 2696
|-
| 8 || align=left| || 2575 || ½ || ½ || 0 || 0 || 0 || ½ || 0 ||  || 1 || 1 ||3½ || ||  || 2629
|-
| 9 || align=left| || 2676 || 0 || ½ || 0 || 0 || ½ || ½ || 0 || 0 ||  || 1 ||2½ || ||  || 2532
|-
| 10 || align=left| || 2579 || 0 || 0 || ½ || 0 || 0 || 0 || ½ || 0 || 0 ||  ||1 || ||  || 2358
|}

Women
{| class="wikitable" style="text-align: center;"
|+63rd Russian Women's Championship Superfinal, 5–14 October 2013, Nizhny Novgorod, Category VIII (2448)
! !! Player !! Rating !! 1 !! 2 !! 3 !! 4 !! 5 !! 6 !! 7 !! 8 !! 9 !! 10 !! Total !! SB !! Wins !! TPR
|-
|-style="background:#ccffcc;"
| 1 || align=left| || 2506 ||  || ½ || 1 || ½ || 1 || 1 || ½ || 1 || 1 || ½ ||7 ||  ||  || 2662
|-
| 2 || align=left| || 2495 || ½ ||  || 1 || ½ || 0 || ½ || 1 || 1 || 1 || 1 ||6½ ||  ||  || 2609
|-
| 3 || align=left| || 2485 || 0 || 0 ||  || ½ || 1 || ½ || 1 || 1 || ½ || 1 ||5½ ||  ||  || 2524
|-
| 4 || align=left| || 2410 || ½ || ½ || ½ ||  || ½ || ½ || ½ || 0 || ½ || 1 ||4½ || 19.75 ||  || 2452
|-
| 5 || align=left| || 2396 || 0 || 1 || 0 || ½ ||  || ½ || 0 || ½ || 1 || 1 ||4½ || 18.25 || 3 || 2454
|-
| 6 || align=left| || 2436 || 0 || ½ || ½ || ½ || ½ ||  || ½ || ½ || 1 || ½ ||4½ || 18.25 || 1 || 2449
|-
| 7 || align=left| || 2515 || ½ || 0 || 0 || ½ || 1 || ½ ||  || 0 || ½ || ½ ||3½ || 15.25 ||  || 2361
|-
| 8 || align=left| || 2459 || 0 || 0 || 0 || 1 || ½ || ½ || 1 ||  || 0 || ½ ||3½ || 13.75 ||  || 2367
|-
| 9 || align=left| || 2435 || 0 || 0 || ½ || ½ || 0 || 0 || ½ || 1 ||  || ½ ||3 ||  ||  || 2324
|-
| 10 || align=left| || 2343 || ½ || 0 || 0 || 0 || 0 || ½ || ½ || ½ || ½ ||  ||2½ ||  ||  || 2294
|}

2014

Men
{| class="wikitable" style="text-align: center;"
|+67th Russian Championship Superfinal, 28 November – 7 December 2014, Kazan, Tatarstan, Russia, Category XIX (2712)
! !! Player !! Rating !! 1 !! 2 !! 3 !! 4 !! 5 !! 6 !! 7 !! 8 !! 9 !! 10 !! Total !! SB !! Wins !!  !! Koya !! TPR !! Place
|-
|-style="background:#ccffcc;"
| 1 || align=left| || 2686 ||  || 0 || 1 || ½ || ½ || 1 || 1 || 0 || ½ || 1 ||5½ ||  ||  ||  ||  || 2795 ||1
|-
| 2 || align=left| || 2745 || 1 ||  || ½ || ½ || ½ || ½ || ½ || ½ || ½ || ½ ||5 ||  ||  ||  ||  || 2752 ||2
|-
| 3 || align=left| || 2679 || 0 || ½ ||  || ½ || ½ || 1 || 1 || 0 || ½ || ½ ||4½ || 20.00 || 2 ||  ||  || 2716 ||3
|-
| 4 || align=left| || 2743 || ½ || ½ || ½ ||  || ½ || ½ || 0 || 1 || ½ || ½ ||4½ || 20.00 || 1 || ½ || 2.5 || 2709 ||4–5
|-
| 5 || align=left| || 2714 || ½ || ½ || ½ || ½ ||  || 0 || ½ || ½ || ½ || 1 ||4½ || 20.00 || 1 || ½ || 2.5 || 2712 ||4–5
|-
| 6 || align=left| || 2738 || 0 || ½ || 0 || ½ || 1 ||  || ½ || 1 || ½ || ½ ||4½ || 19.50 || 2 || ½ || 2.5 || 2709 ||6–7
|-
| 7 || align=left| || 2724 || 0 || ½ || 0 || 1 || ½ || ½ ||  || ½ || 1 || ½ ||4½ || 19.50 || 2 || ½ || 2.5 || 2711 ||6–7
|-
| 8 || align=left| || 2655 || 1 || ½ || 1 || 0 || ½ || 0 || ½ ||  || ½ || 0 ||4 || 19.00 ||  ||  ||  || 2676 ||8
|-
| 9 || align=left| || 2669 || ½ || ½ || ½ || ½ || ½ || ½ || 0 || ½ ||  || ½ ||4 || 18.25 ||  ||  ||  || 2674 ||9
|-
| 10 || align=left| || 2770 || 0 || ½ || ½ || ½ || 0 || ½ || ½ || 1 || ½ ||  ||4 || 17.50 ||  ||  ||  || 2663 ||10
|}

Women
{| class="wikitable" style="text-align: center;"
|+64th Russian Women's Championship Superfinal, 28 November – 7 December 2014, Kazan, Tatarstan, Russia, Category IX (2453)
! !! Player !! Rating !! 1 !! 2 !! 3 !! 4 !! 5 !! 6 !! 7 !! 8 !! 9 !! 10 !! Total !! SB !! TPR
|-
|-style="background:#ccffcc;"
| 1 || align=left| || 2522 ||  || 1 || 0 || 1 || 1 || 0 || 1 || 1 || 1 || 1 ||7 ||  || 2666
|-
| 2 || align=left| || 2471 || 0 ||  || ½ || 1 || 0 || 1 || 1 || 1 || 1 || ½ ||6 ||  || 2576
|-
| 3 || align=left| || 2438 || 1 || ½ ||  || 0 || 1 || ½ || 0 || 1 || ½ || 1 ||5½ || 23.00 || 2535
|-
| 4 || align=left| || 2457 || 0 || 0 || 1 ||  || 1 || 1 || ½ || 0 || 1 || 1 ||5½ || 21.75 || 2533
|-
| 5 || align=left| || 2439 || 0 || 1 || 0 || 0 ||  || ½ || 1 || ½ || 1 || 1 ||5 ||  || 2498
|-
| 6 || align=left| || 2439 || 1 || 0 || ½ || 0 || ½ ||  || 0 || 1 || ½ || 1 ||4½ || 18.00 || 2455
|-
| 7 || align=left| || 2541 || 0 || 0 || 1 || ½ || 0 || 1 ||  || 1 || 1 || 0 ||4½ || 17.75 || 2444
|-
| 8 || align=left| || 2411 || 0 || 0 || 0 || 1 || ½ || 0 || 0 ||  || 0 || 1 ||2½ || 10.00 || 2292
|-
| 9 || align=left| || 2480 || 0 || 0 || ½ || 0 || 0 || ½ || 0 || 1 ||  || ½ ||2½ || 8.75 || 2284
|-
| 10 || align=left| || 2335 || 0 || ½ || 0 || 0 || 0 || 0 || 1 || 0 || ½ ||  ||2 ||  || 2246
|}

2015

Men
{| class="wikitable" style="text-align: center;"
|+68th Russian Championship Superfinal, 9–20 August 2015, Chita, Zabaykalsky Krai, Russia, Category XVIII (2694)
! !! Player !! Rating !! 1 !! 2 !! 3 !! 4 !! 5 !! 6 !! 7 !! 8 !! 9 !! 10 !! 11 !! 12 !! Total !!  !! SB !! Wins !!  !! TPR
|-
|-style="background:#ccffcc;"
| 1 || align=left| || 2747 ||  || ½ || ½ || ½ || ½ || 1 || ½ || 1 || ½ || 1 || ½ || 1 ||7½ ||  ||  ||  ||  || 2823
|-
| 2 || align=left| || 2753 || ½ ||  || ½ || ½ || ½ || 1 || 1 || ½ || 1 || ½ || ½ || ½ ||7 ||  ||  ||  ||  || 2791
|-
| 3 || align=left| || 2719 || ½ || ½ ||  || ½ || ½ || 1 || ½ || ½ || ½ || 1 || ½ || ½ ||6½ ||  ||  ||  ||  || 2757
|-
| 4 || align=left| || 2759 || ½ || ½ || ½ ||  || 1 || ½ || 0 || ½ || ½ || ½ || ½ || ½ ||5½ || 6 || 30.25 || 1 || 1 || 2688
|-
| 5 || align=left| || 2654 || ½ || ½ || ½ || 0 ||  || 1 || ½ || ½ || ½ || ½ || ½ || ½ ||5½ || 6 || 30.25 || 1 || 0 || 2698
|-
| 6 || align=left| || 2642 || 0 || 0 || 0 || ½ || 0 ||  || 1 || ½ || 1 || ½ || 1 || 1 ||5½ || 6 || 26.25 ||  ||  || 2699
|-
| 7 || align=left| || 2671 || ½ || 0 || ½ || 1 || ½ || 0 ||  || 0 || ½ || ½ || 1 || 1 ||5½ || 5 ||  ||  ||  || 2696
|-
| 8 || align=left| || 2673 || 0 || ½ || ½ || ½ || ½ || ½ || 1 ||  || 0 || ½ || ½ || ½ ||5 || 6 || 27.00 ||  ||  || 2660
|-
| 9 || align=left| || 2739 || ½ || 0 || ½ || ½ || ½ || 0 || ½ || 1 ||  || ½ || ½ || ½ ||5 || 6 || 26.75 ||  ||  || 2654
|-
| 10 || align=left| || 2655 || 0 || ½ || 0 || ½ || ½ || ½ || ½ || ½ || ½ ||  || ½ || 1 ||5 || 5 ||  ||  ||  || 2662
|-
| 11 || align=left| || 2658 || ½ || ½ || ½ || ½ || ½ || 0 || 0 || ½ || ½ || ½ ||  || 0 ||4 || 5 || 23.50 ||  ||  || 2596
|-
| 12 || align=left| || 2662 || 0 || ½ || ½ || ½ || ½ || 0 || 0 || ½ || ½ || 0 || 1 ||  ||4 || 5 || 21.25 ||  ||  || 2595
|}

Women
{| class="wikitable" style="text-align: center;"
|+65th Russian Women's Championship Superfinal, 9–20 August 2015, Chita, Zabaykalsky Krai, Russia, Category IX (2460)
! !! Player !! Rating !! 1 !! 2 !! 3 !! 4 !! 5 !! 6 !! 7 !! 8 !! 9 !! 10 !! 11 !! 12 !! Total !!  !! SB !! TPR
|-
|-style="background:#ccffcc;"
| 1 || align=left| || 2474 ||  || 1 || ½ || 1 || 1 || ½ || 0 || 1 || ½ || 1 || ½ || 1 ||8 ||  ||  || 2634
|-
| 2 || align=left| || 2431 || 0 ||  || ½ || ½ || ½ || ½ || 1 || ½ || ½ || 1 || 1 || 1 ||7 || 6 ||  || 2565
|-
| 3 || align=left| || 2526 || ½ || ½ ||  || 0 || 1 || ½ || 1 || ½ || 1 || ½ || 1 || ½ ||7 || 5 ||  || 2556
|-
| 4 || align=left| || 2453 || 0 || ½ || 1 ||  || 1 || ½ || ½ || ½ || ½ || ½ || ½ || 1 ||6½ || 6 ||  || 2526
|-
| 5 || align=left| || 2531 || 0 || ½ || 0 || 0 ||  || 1 || 1 || 1 || 1 || 0 || 1 || 1 ||6½ || 5 ||  || 2519
|-
| 6 || align=left| || 2530 || ½ || ½ || ½ || ½ || 0 ||  || ½ || 0 || 1 || 1 || 1 || ½ ||6 ||  ||  || 2490
|-
| 7 || align=left| || 2429 || 1 || 0 || 0 || ½ || 0 || ½ ||  || ½ || 1 || 1 || ½ || ½ ||5½ || 5 || 27.75 || 2463
|-
| 8 || align=left| || 2487 || 0 || ½ || ½ || ½ || 0 || 1 || ½ ||  || ½ || 1 || 0 || 1 ||5½ || 5 || 27.50 || 2458
|-
| 9 || align=left| || 2460 || ½ || ½ || 0 || ½ || 0 || 0 || 0 || ½ ||  || ½ || 1 || ½ ||4 ||  ||  || 2358
|-
| 10 || align=left| || 2327 || 0 || 0 || ½ || ½ || 1 || 0 || 0 || 0 || ½ ||  || 0 || 1 ||3½ || 6 ||  || 2339
|-
| 11 || align=left| || 2441 || ½ || 0 || 0 || ½ || 0 || 0 || ½ || 1 || 0 || 1 ||  || 0 ||3½ || 5 ||  || 2329
|-
| 12 || align=left| || 2431 || 0 || 0 || ½ || 0 || 0 || ½ || ½ || 0 || ½ || 0 || 1 ||  ||3 ||  ||  || 2288
|}

2016

Men
{| class="wikitable" style="text-align: center;"
|+69th Russian Championship Superfinal, 16–27 October 2016, Novosibirsk, Novosibirsk Oblast, Russia, Category XVIII (2684)
! !! Player !! Rating !! 1 !! 2 !! 3 !! 4 !! 5 !! 6 !! 7 !! 8 !! 9 !! 10 !! 11 !! 12 !! Total !!  !! SB !! TPR
|-
|-style="background:#ccffcc;"
| 1 || align=left| || 2651 ||  || ½ || ½ || ½ || ½ || ½ || ½ || 1 || ½ || ½ || 1 || 1 ||7 || || || 2789
|-
| 2 || align=left| || 2752 || ½ ||  || ½ || ½ || ½ || 1 || ½ || ½ || ½ || ½ || 1 || ½ ||6½ || 6 || || 2742
|-
| 3 || align=left| || 2724 || ½ || ½ ||  || ½ || ½ || ½ || ½ || ½ || ½ || 1 || ½ || 1 ||6½ || 5 || || 2745
|-
| 4 || align=left| || 2745 || ½ || ½ || ½ ||  || ½ || ½ || ½ || ½ || ½ || 1 || ½ || ½ ||6 || 5 || 32.50 || 2714
|-
| 5 || align=left| || 2665 || ½ || ½ || ½ || ½ ||  || 0 || 1 || ½ || ½ || ½ || ½ || 1 ||6 || 5 || 31.25 || 2721
|-
| 6 || align=left| || 2617 || ½ || 0 || ½ || ½ || 1 ||  || ½ || ½ || 1 || 0 || ½ || ½ ||5½ || 6 || 30.25 || 2690
|-
| 7 || align=left| || 2721 || ½ || ½ || ½ || ½ || 0 || ½ ||  || ½ || ½ || ½ || ½ || 1 ||5½ || 6 || 28.50 || 2680
|-
| 8 || align=left| || 2714 || 0 || ½ || ½ || ½ || ½ || ½ || ½ ||  || 0 || 1 || ½ || 1 ||5½ || 6 || 27.75 || 2681
|-
| 9 || align=left| || 2635 || ½ || ½ || ½ || ½ || ½ || 0 || ½ || 1 ||  || ½ || ½ || ½ ||5½ || 5 || || 2688
|-
| 10 || align=left| || 2732 || ½ || ½ || 0 || 0 || ½ || 1 || ½ || 0 || ½ ||  || ½ || 1 ||5 || || || 2643
|-
| 11 || align=left| || 2636 || 0 || 0 || ½ || ½ || ½ || ½ || ½ || ½ || ½ || ½ ||  || ½ ||4½ || || || 2623
|-
| 12 || align=left| || 2611 || 0 || ½ || 0 || ½ || 0 || ½ || 0 || 0 || ½ || 0 || ½ ||  ||2½ || || || 2478
|}

Women
{| class="wikitable" style="text-align: center;"
|+66th Russian Women's Championship Superfinal, 16–27 October 2016, Novosibirsk, Novosibirsk Oblast, Russia, Category VIII (2441)
! !! Player !! Rating !! 1 !! 2 !! 3 !! 4 !! 5 !! 6 !! 7 !! 8 !! 9 !! 10 !! 11 !! 12 !! Total !!  !! SB !! TPR
|-
|-style="background:#ccffcc;"
| 1 || align=left| || 2537 ||  || 0 || 1 || ½ || 1 || ½ || 1 || 1 || 1 || ½ || 1 || 1 ||8½ ||  ||  || 2641
|-
| 2 || align=left| || 2484 || 1 ||  || 1 || ½ || 1 || 0 || ½ || ½ || ½ || 1 || 1 || 0 ||7 ||  ||  || 2537
|-
| 3 || align=left| || 2463 || 0 || 0 ||  || ½ || 1 || ½ || 1 || 0 || 1 || 1 || ½ || 1 ||6½ ||  ||  || 2502
|-
| 4 || align=left| || 2446 || ½ || ½ || ½ ||  || 0 || 1 || ½ || 0 || ½ || 1 || ½ || 1 ||6 || 6 || 30.25 || 2473
|-
| 5 || align=left| || 2535 || 0 || 0 || 0 || 1 ||  || 0 || 1 || 1 || 0 || 1 || 1 || 1 ||6 || 6 || 27.00 || 2465
|-
| 6 || align=left| || 2336 || ½ || 1 || ½ || 0 || 1 ||  || 0 || 1 || ½ || 0 || ½ || 1 ||6 || 5 || 32.25 || 2483
|-
| 7 || align=left| || 2386 || 0 || ½ || 0 || ½ || 0 || 1 ||  || ½ || ½ || 1 || 1 || 1 ||6 || 5 || 27.25 || 2478
|-
| 8 || align=left| || 2362 || 0 || ½ || 1 || 1 || 0 || 0 || ½ ||  || ½ || ½ || ½ || 1 ||5½ ||  ||  || 2444
|-
| 9 || align=left| || 2460 || 0 || ½ || 0 || ½ || 1 || ½ || ½ || ½ ||  || 0 || ½ || 1 ||5 ||  ||  || 2399
|-
| 10 || align=left| || 2450 || ½ || 0 || 0 || 0 || 0 || 1 || 0 || ½ || 1 ||  || 0 || 1 ||4 ||  ||  || 2334
|-
| 11 || align=left| || 2462 || 0 || 0 || ½ || ½ || 0 || ½ || 0 || ½ || ½ || 1 ||  || 0 ||3½ ||  ||  || 2302
|-
| 12 || align=left| || 2346 || 0 || 1 || 0 || 0 || 0 || 0 || 0 || 0 || 0 || 0 || 1 ||  ||2 ||  ||  || 2184
|}

2017
Men
{| class="wikitable" style="text-align: center;"
|+70th Russian Championship Superfinal, 3–14 December 2017, Saint Petersburg, Russia, Category XVIII (2690)
! !! Player !! Rating !! 1 !! 2 !! 3 !! 4 !! 5 !! 6 !! 7 !! 8 !! 9 !! 10 !! 11 !! 12 !! Total !! TB !!  !! SB !! TPR
|-
|-style="background:#ccffcc;"
| 1 || align=left| || 2765 ||  || ½ || 0 || 1 || ½ || ½ || 1 || ½ || ½ || ½ || 1 || 1 ||7 || 2 ||  ||  || 2785
|-
| 2 || align=left| || 2722 || ½ ||  || ½ || 1 || ½ || ½ || ½ || ½ || ½ || ½ || 1 || 1 ||7 || 0 ||  ||  || 2789
|-
| 3 || align=left| || 2683 || 1 || ½ ||  || ½ || 0 || ½ || 0 || 1 || ½ || ½ || 1 || 1 ||6½ ||  || 5 || 33.00 || 2756
|-
| 4 || align=left| || 2718 || 0 || 0 || ½ ||  || 1 || 1 || 0 || ½ || 1 || 1 || ½ || 1 ||6½ ||  || 5 || 32.00 || 2753
|-
| 5 || align=left| || 2713 || ½ || ½ || 1 || 0 ||  || ½ || ½ || ½ || ½ || ½ || ½ || 1 ||6 ||  || 6 || 31.50 || 2724
|-
| 6 || align=left| || 2650 || ½ || ½ || ½ || 0 || ½ ||  || ½ || ½ || 1 || ½ || ½ || 1 ||6 ||  || 6 || 30.75 || 2730
|-
| 7 || align=left| || 2686 || 0 || ½ || 1 || 0 || 1 || ½ ||  || ½ || 0 || ½ || ½ || 1 ||6 ||  || 5 ||  || 2727
|-
| 8 || align=left| || 2689 || ½ || ½ || 0 || ½ || ½ || ½ || ½ ||  || ½ || ½ || ½ || ½ ||5 ||  || 6 ||  || 2654
|-
| 9 || align=left| || 2650 || ½ || ½ || ½ || 0 || ½ || 0 || 1 || ½ ||  || ½ || 1 || 0 ||5 ||  || 5 ||  || 2658
|-
| 10 || align=left| || 2735 || ½ || ½ || ½ || 0 || ½ || ½ || ½ || ½ || ½ ||  || ½ || 0 ||4½ ||  ||  ||  || 2621
|-
| 11 || align=left| || 2626 || 0 || 0 || 0 || ½ || ½ || ½ || ½ || ½ || 0 || ½ ||  || ½ ||3½ ||  ||  ||  || 2563
|-
| 12 || align=left| || 2645 || 0 || 0 || 0 || 0 || 0 || 0 || 0 || ½ || 1 || 1 || ½ ||  ||3 ||  ||  ||  || 2519
|}

Women
{| class="wikitable" style="text-align: center;"
|+67th Russian Women's Championship Superfinal, 3–14 December 2017, Saint Petersburg, Russia, Category VIII (2435)
! !! Player !! Rating !! 1 !! 2 !! 3 !! 4 !! 5 !! 6 !! 7 !! 8 !! 9 !! 10 !! 11 !! 12 !! Total !! TB !!  !! SB !! TPR
|-
|-style="background:#ccffcc;"
| 1 || align=left| || 2486 ||  || ½ || 0 || 1 || ½ || 0 || ½ || 1 || 1 || 1 || 1 || ½ ||7 || 2 ||  ||  || 2533
|-
| 2 || align=left| || 2469 || ½ ||  || ½ || ½ || 0 || 1 || ½ || 1 || ½ || 1 || ½ || 1 ||7 || 0 ||  ||  || 2534
|-
| 3 || align=left| || 2452 || 1 || ½ ||  || ½ || 0 || 1 || 1 || ½ || ½ || ½ || 0 || 1 ||6½ ||  || 6 ||  || 2499
|-
| 4 || align=left| || 2484 || 0 || ½ || ½ ||  || 1 || ½ || ½ || 1 || ½ || ½ || ½ || 1 ||6½ ||  || 5 ||  || 2496
|-
| 5 || align=left| || 2428 || ½ || 1 || 1 || 0 ||  || 0 || ½ || ½ || ½ || ½ || ½ || 1 ||6 ||  || 5 || 32.25 || 2472
|-
| 6 || align=left| || 2510 || 1 || 0 || 0 || ½ || 1 ||  || ½ || ½ || 0 || 1 || 1 || ½ ||6 ||  || 5 || 31.50 || 2464
|-
| 7 || align=left| || 2385 || ½ || ½ || ½ || 0 || ½ || ½ ||  || ½ || 0 || 0 || 1 || 1 ||5 ||  || 6 || 26.25 || 2404
|-
| 8 || align=left| || 2424 || 0 || 0 || ½ || ½ || ½ || ½ || ½ ||  || 1 || ½ || ½ || ½ ||5 ||  || 6 || 26.00 || 2400
|-
| 9 || align=left| || 2373 || 0 || ½ || 0 || ½ || ½ || 1 || 1 || 0 ||  || ½ || ½ || ½ ||5 ||  || 5 ||  || 2405
|-
| 10 || align=left| || 2364 || 0 || 0 || ½ || ½ || ½ || 0 || 1 || ½ || ½ ||  || ½ || ½ ||4½ ||  ||  ||  || 2377
|-
| 11 || align=left| || 2405 || 0 || ½ || 1 || ½ || ½ || 0 || 0 || ½ || ½ || ½ ||  || 0 ||4 ||  ||  ||  || 2336
|-
| 12 || align=left| || 2443 || ½ || 0 || 0 || 0 || 0 || ½ || 0 || ½ || ½ || ½ || 1 ||  ||3½ ||  ||  ||  || 2302
|}

2018
Men
{| class="wikitable" style="text-align: center;"
|+71st Russian Championship Superfinal, 25 August – 5 September 2018, Satka, Chelyabinsk Oblast, Russia, Category XVIII (2685)
! !! Player !! Rating !! 1 !! 2 !! 3 !! 4 !! 5 !! 6 !! 7 !! 8 !! 9 !! 10 !! 11 !! 12 !! Total !! TB !!  !! SB !! TPR
|-
|-style="background:#ccffcc;"
| 1 || align=left| || 2710 ||  || ½ || ½ || ½ || 1 || ½ || ½ || 1 || ½ || ½ || ½ || 1 ||7 || 1½ ||  ||  || 2785
|-
| 2 || align=left| || 2748 || ½ ||  || ½ || ½ || ½ || 1 || 1 || 1 || 1 || ½ || 0 || ½ ||7 || ½ ||  ||  || 2781
|-
| 3 || align=left| || 2702 || ½ || ½ ||  || ½ || ½ || ½ || ½ || 1 || ½ || ½ || 1 || ½ ||6½ ||  ||  ||  || 2749
|-
| 4 || align=left| || 2690 || ½ || ½ || ½ ||  || 1 || ½ || ½ || 0 || ½ || ½ || ½ || 1 ||6 ||  || 6 || 32.00 || 2721
|-
| 5 || align=left| || 2707 || 0 || ½ || ½ || 0 ||  || 1 || ½ || ½ || ½ || 1 || ½ || 1 ||6 ||  || 6 || 30.25 || 2719
|-
| 6 || align=left| || 2768 || ½ || 0 || ½ || ½ || 0 ||  || 1 || ½ || 1 || ½ || ½ || 1 ||6 ||  || 5 ||  || 2714
|-
| 7 || align=left| || 2609 || ½ || 0 || ½ || ½ || ½ || 0 ||  || ½ || ½ || 1 || 1 || ½ ||5½ ||  ||  ||  || 2692
|-
| 8 || align=left| || 2691 || 0 || 0 || 0 || 1 || ½ || ½ || ½ ||  || ½ || ½ || ½ || 1 ||5 ||  || 6 ||  || 2649
|-
| 9 || align=left| || 2613 || ½ || 0 || ½ || ½ || ½ || 0 || ½ || ½ ||  || ½ || 1 || ½ ||5 ||  || 5 ||  || 2656
|-
| 10 || align=left| || 2730 || ½ || ½ || ½ || ½ || 0 || ½ || 0 || ½ || ½ ||  || ½ || ½ ||4½ ||  || 6 ||  || 2616
|-
| 11 || align=left| || 2619 || ½ || 1 || 0 || ½ || ½ || ½ || 0 || ½ || 0 || ½ ||  || ½ ||4½ ||  || 5 ||  || 2626
|-
| 12 || align=left| || 2634 || 0 || ½ || ½ || 0 || 0 || 0 || ½ || 0 || ½ || ½ || ½ || ||3 ||  ||  ||  || 2515
|}

Women
{| class="wikitable" style="text-align: center;"
|+68th Russian Women's Championship Superfinal, 25 August – 5 September 2018, Satka, Chelyabinsk Oblast, Russia, Category VIII (2445)
! !! Player !! Rating !! 1 !! 2 !! 3 !! 4 !! 5 !! 6 !! 7 !! 8 !! 9 !! 10 !! 11 !! 12 !! Total !! TB !!  !! TPR
|-
|-style="background:#ccffcc;"
| 1 || align=left| || 2469 ||  || 0 || 0 || ½ || 1 || 1 || 1 || ½ || 1 || 1 || ½ || 1 ||7½ || 1½ ||  || 2575
|-
| 2 || align=left| || 2462 || 1 ||  || ½ || 1 || ½ || ½ || ½ || 1 || ½ || ½ || ½ || 1 ||7½ || ½ ||  || 2576
|-
| 3 || align=left| || 2535 || 1 || ½ ||  || 0 || 0 || 0 || 1 || 1 || 1 || ½ || 1 || 1 ||7 ||  || 6 || 2538
|-
| 4 || align=left| || 2440 || ½ || 0 || 1 ||  || ½ || 1 || ½ || 0 || 1 || 1 || 1 || ½ ||7 ||  || 5 || 2547
|-
| 5 || align=left| || 2559 || 0 || ½ || 1 || ½ ||  || ½ || 0 || 0 || 1 || 1 || 1 || 1 ||6½ ||  || 6 || 2499
|-
| 6 || align=left| || 2528 || 0 || ½ || 1 || 0 || ½ ||  || ½ || 1 || ½ || 1 || ½ || 1 ||6½ ||  || 5 || 2502
|-
| 7 || align=left| || 2424 || 0 || ½ || 0 || ½ || 1 || ½ ||  || 1 || 0 || 1 || ½ || 1 ||6 ||  ||  || 2482
|-
| 8 || align=left| || 2413 || ½ || 0 || 0 || 1 || 1 || 0 || 0 ||  || ½ || 1 || 0 || 1 ||5 ||  ||  || 2411
|-
| 9 || align=left| || 2391 || 0 || ½ || 0 || 0 || 0 || ½ || 1 || ½ ||  || 0 || 1 || ½ ||4 ||  ||  || 2347
|-
| 10 || align=left| || 2332 || 0 || ½ || ½ || 0 || 0 || 0 || 0 || 0 || 1 ||  || 1 || ½ ||3½ ||  ||  || 2322
|-
| 11 || align=left| || 2449 || ½ || ½ || 0 || 0 || 0 || ½ || ½ || 1 || 0 || 0 ||  || 0 ||3 ||  ||  || 2269
|-
| 12 || align=left| || 2332 || 0 || 0 || 0 || ½ || 0 || 0 || 0 || 0 || ½ || ½ || 1 || ||2½ ||  ||  || 2244
|}

2019
Men
{| class="wikitable" style="text-align: center;"
|+72nd Russian Championship Superfinal, 10–22 August 2019, Votkinsk – Izhevsk, Udmurtia, Russia, Category XVIII (2688)
! !! Player !! Rating !! 1 !! 2 !! 3 !! 4 !! 5 !! 6 !! 7 !! 8 !! 9 !! 10 !! 11 !! 12 !! Total !!  !! SB !! TPR
|-
|-style="background:#ccffcc;"
| 1 || align=left| || 2706 ||  || ½ || ½ || ½ || 1 || ½ || ½ || 1 || ½ || 1 || ½ || ½ ||7 ||  ||  || 2785
|-
| 2 || align=left| || 2728 || ½ ||  || ½ || ½ || 1 || ½ || 1 || ½ || ½ || ½ || ½ || ½ ||6½ || 6 || 35.25 || 2750
|-
| 3 || align=left| || 2710 || ½ || ½ ||  || ½ || ½ || ½ || 1 || ½ || 1 || ½ || ½ || ½ ||6½ || 6 || 35.00 || 2751
|-
| 4 || align=left| || 2682 || ½ || ½ || ½ ||  || 0 || 1 || 0 || ½ || 1 || ½ || 1 || 1 ||6½ || 6 || 33.50 || 2754
|-
| 5 || align=left| || 2757 || 0 || 0 || ½ || 1 ||  || ½ || ½ || 1 || 0 || 1 || ½ || ½ ||5½ || 6 ||  || 2682
|-
| 6 || align=left| || 2668 || ½ || ½ || ½ || 0 || ½ ||  || 1 || ½ || ½ || ½ || ½ || ½ ||5½ || 5 || 29.75 || 2690
|-
| 7 || align=left| || 2650 || ½ || 0 || 0 || 1 || ½ || 0 ||  || ½ || ½ || 1 || ½ || 1 ||5½ || 5 || 28.25 || 2692
|-
| 8 || align=left| || 2668 || 0 || ½ || ½ || ½ || 0 || ½ || ½ ||  || ½ || 1 || ½ || 1 ||5½ || 5 || 28.00 || 2690
|-
| 9 || align=left| || 2662 || ½ || ½ || 0 || 0 || 1 || ½ || ½ || ½ ||  || ½ || ½ || ½ ||5 ||  ||  || 2655
|-
| 10 || align=left| || 2671 || 0 || ½ || ½ || ½ || 0 || ½ || 0 || 0 || ½ ||  || 1 || 1 ||4½ || 6 ||  || 2625
|-
| 11 || align=left| || 2655 || ½ || ½ || ½ || 0 || ½ || ½ || ½ || ½ || ½ || 0 ||  || ½ ||4½ || 5 ||  || 2626
|-
| 12 || align=left| || 2704 || ½ || ½ || ½ || 0 || ½ || ½ || 0 || 0 || ½ || 0 || ½ || ||3½ ||  ||  || 2554
|}

Women
{| class="wikitable" style="text-align: center;"
|+69th Russian Women's Championship Superfinal, 10–22 August 2019, Votkinsk – Izhevsk, Udmurtia, Russia, Category VIII (2435)
! !! Player !! Rating !! 1 !! 2 !! 3 !! 4 !! 5 !! 6 !! 7 !! 8 !! 9 !! 10 !! 11 !! 12 !! Total !! TB !!  !! SB  !! TPR
|-
|-style="background:#ccffcc;"
| 1 || align=left| || 2462 ||  || ½ || 0 || 1 || ½ || ½ || 1 || 1 || ½ || 1 || 1 || 1 ||8 || 1+ || ||  || 2608
|-
| 2 || align=left| || 2457 || ½ ||  || ½ || 1 || ½ || ½ ||  0|| 1 || 1 || 1 || 1 || 1 ||8 || 1 || ||  || 2608
|-
| 3 || align=left| || 2564 || 1 || ½ ||  || ½ || ½ || 1 || ½ || ½ || ½ || 1 || ½ || 1 ||7½ ||  || ||  || 2556
|-
| 4 || align=left| || 2497 || 0 || 0 || ½ ||  || 1 || 1 || 1 || 1 || ½ || 1 || 0 || 1 ||7 || ||  ||  || 2531
|-
| 5 || align=left| || 2335 || ½ || ½ || ½ || 0 ||  || 1 || 1 || 0 || 1 || ½ || ½ || ½ ||6 || ||  6 || 31.75 || 2480
|-
| 6 || align=left| || 2491 || ½ || ½ || 0 || 0 || 0 ||  || 1 || 1 || 1 || ½ || 1 || ½ ||6 || || 6 || 28.50 || 2466
|-
| 7 || align=left| || 2507 || 0 || 1 || ½ || 0 || 0 || 0 ||  || 1 || 1 || 0 || 1 || 1 ||5½ || ||  ||  || 2429
|-
| 8 || align=left| || 2352 || 0 || 0 || ½ || 0 || 1 || 0 || 0 ||  || ½ || 1 || 1 || 1 ||5 || ||  ||  || 2407
|-
| 9 || align=left| || 2429 || ½ || 0 || ½ || ½ || 0 || 0 || 0 || ½ ||  || ½ || ½ || 1 ||4 || || 6 ||  || 2334
|-
| 10 || align=left| || 2419 || 0 || 0 || 0 || 0 || ½ || ½ || 1 || 0 || ½ ||  || ½ || 1 ||4 || || 5 ||  || 2335
|-
| 11 || align=left| || 2376 || 0 || 0 || ½ || 1 || ½ || 0 || 0 || 0 || ½ || ½ ||  || 0 ||3 || ||  ||  || 2265
|-
| 12 || align=left| || 2332 || 0 || 0 || 0 || 0 || ½ || ½ || 0 || 0 || 0 || 0 || 1 || ||2 || ||  ||  || 2244
|}

First-place tiebreak
{| class="wikitable" style="text-align: center;"
! Player !! Rapid rating !! Blitz rating !! colspan="2" | Rapid chess !! Armageddon !! Place
|-
| align=left||| 2359 || 2330
| style="background: white; color: black" | 1 
| style="background: black; color: white" | 0 
| style="background: white; color: black" | 1 
|| 1|-
| align=left|
|| 2501 || 2302
| style="background: black; color: white" | 0
| style="background: white; color: black" | 1 
| style="background: black; color: white" | 0 
|| 2
|}

2020
Men
{| class="wikitable" style="text-align: center;"
|+73rd Russian Championship Superfinal, 4–16 December 2020, Moscow, Russia, Category XVIII (2690)
! !! Player !! Rating !! 1 !! 2 !! 3 !! 4 !! 5 !! 6 !! 7 !! 8 !! 9 !! 10 !! 11 !! 12 !! Total !!  !! SB !! TPR
|-
|-style="background:#ccffcc;"
| 1 || align=left| ||2784
| || 1 || ½ || 0 || ½ || ½ || ½ || ½ || 1 || 1 || 1 || 1 || 7½ ||  ||  || 2814
|-
| 2 || align=left| ||2752
| 0 ||  || ½ || 0 || 1 || ½ || 1 || 1 || ½ || 1 || ½ || 1 || 7 ||  ||  || 2786
|-
| 3 || align=left|||2674
| ½ || ½ ||  || 1 || ½ || ½ || ½ || ½ || ½ || 1 || ½ || ½ || 6½ || 5 || 35.50 || 2756
|-
| 4 || align=left| ||2702
| 1 || 1 || 0 ||  || ½ || 0 || ½ || ½ || 1 || ½ || 1 || ½ || 6½ || 5 || 35.00 || 2753
|-
| 5 || align=left| ||2711
| ½ || 0 || ½ || ½ ||  || 0 || ½ || ½ || 1 || 1 || ½ || + || 6 || 6 ||  || 2695
|-
| 6 || align=left| ||2619
| ½ || ½ || ½ || 1 || 1 ||  || ½ || ½ || ½ || 0 || 0 || + || 6 || 5 ||  || 2704
|-
| 7 || align=left| ||2720
| ½ || 0 || ½ || ½ || ½ || ½ ||  || ½ || ½ || ½ || 1 || ½ || 5½ || 5 || 28.50 || 2687
|-
| 8 || align=left| ||2723
| ½ || 0 || ½ || ½ || ½ || ½ || ½ ||  || ½ || ½ || ½ || + || 5½ || 5 || 27.75 || 2658
|-
| 9 || align=left| ||2686
| 0 || ½ || ½ || 0 || 0 || ½ || ½ || ½ ||  || ½ || 1 || + || 5 || 6 || 23.25 || 2626
|-
| 10 || align=left| ||2698
| 0 || 0 || 0 || ½ || 0 || 1 || ½ || ½ || ½ ||  || 1 || + || 5 || 6 || 22.75 || 2625
|-
| 11 || align=left| ||2594
| 0 || ½ || ½ || 0 || ½ || 1 || 0 || ½ || 0 || 0 ||  || ½ || 3½ ||  ||  || 2565
|-
| 12 || align=left| ||2611
| 0 || 0 || ½ || ½ || - || - || ½ || - || - || - || ½ ||  || 2 ||  ||  || 2579
|}

Women
{| class="wikitable" style="text-align: center;"
|+70th Russian Women's Championship Superfinal, 4–16 December 2020, Moscow, Russia, Category VIII (2428)
! !! Player !! Rating !! 1 !! 2 !! 3 !! 4 !! 5 !! 6 !! 7 !! 8 !! 9 !! 10 !! 11 !! 12 !! Total !! TB !!  !! SB  !! TPR
|-
|-style="background:#ccffcc;"
| 1 || align=left| ||2593
| || ½ || ½ || ½ || ½ || ½ || 1 || ½ || 1 || 1 || 1 || 1 || 8 || 1+ ||  || ||2588
|-
| 2 || align=left| ||2456
| ½ ||  || 1 || 1 || 1 || ½ || 0 || 1 || ½ || 1 || ½ || 1 || 8 || 1 ||  ||  ||2601
|-
| 3 || align=left| ||2471
| ½ || 0 ||  || 0 || ½ || 1 || 0 || 1 || ½ || 1 || 1 || 1 || 6½ ||  || 6 || 29.75 ||2489
|-
| 4 || align=left|||2359
| ½ || 0 || 1 ||  || 0 || 0 || 1 || 0 || 1 || 1 || 1 || 1 || 6½ ||  || 6 || 28.50 ||2500
|-
| 5 || align=left| ||2494
| ½ || 0 || ½ || 1 ||  || ½ || 1 || ½ || ½ || 0 || 1 || 1 || 6½ ||  || 5 || 32.50 ||2487
|-
| 6 || align=left|||2348
| ½ || ½ || 0 || 1 || ½ ||  || ½ || ½ || ½ || ½ || 1 || 1 || 6½ ||  || 5 || 32.00 ||2501
|-
| 7 || align=left| ||2438
| 0 || 1 || 1 || 0 || 0 || ½ ||  || 0 || 1 || 1 || ½ || 1 || 6 ||  || 6 ||  ||2463
|-
| 8 || align=left| ||2474
| ½ || 0 || 0 || 1 || ½ || ½ || 1 ||  || ½ || 0 || 1 || 1 || 6 ||  || 5 ||  ||2460
|-
| 9 || align=left| ||2464
| 0 || ½ || ½ || 0 || ½ || ½ || 0 || ½ ||  || 0 || 1 || ½ || 4 ||  ||  ||  ||2323
|-
| 10 || align=left| ||2451
| 0 || 0 || 0 || 0 || 1 || ½ || 0 || 1 || 1 ||  || 0 || 0 || 3½ ||  ||  ||  ||2293
|-
| 11 || align=left|||2290
| 0 || ½ || 0 || 0 || 0 || 0 || ½ || 0 || 0 || 1 ||  || ½ || 2½ ||  ||  ||  ||2230
|-
| 12 || align=left|||2302
| 0 || 0 || 0 || 0 || 0 || 0 || 0 || 0 || ½ || 1 || ½ ||  || 2 ||  ||  ||  ||2178
|}

First-place tiebreak
{| class="wikitable" style="text-align: center;"
! Player !! Rapid rating !! Blitz rating !! colspan="2" | Rapid chess !! Armageddon !! Place
|-
| align=left||| 2502 || 2441
| style="background: black; color: white" | ½ 
| style="background: white; color: black" | ½ 
| style="background: white; color: black" | 1 
|| 1|-
| align=left|
|| 2394 || 2299
| style="background: white; color: black" | ½ 
| style="background: black; color: white" | ½
| style="background: black; color: white" | 0 
|| 2
|}

 2021 
 Open 
{| class="wikitable" style="text-align: center;"
|+74th Russian Championship Superfinal, 9–20 October 2021, Ufa, Russia, Category XVIII (2676.5)
! !! Player !! Rating !! 1 !! 2 !! 3 !! 4 !! 5 !! 6 !! 7 !! 8 !! 9 !! 10 !! 11 !! 12 !! Total !!  !! SB !! Wins !! Koya !! TPR
|-
|-style="background:#ccffcc;"
| 1 || align=left| ||2727
| || ½ || 1 || 1 || ½ || ½ || ½ || ½ || 1 || ½ || ½ || ½ || 7 ||  ||  || || || 2781
|-
| 2 || align=left| ||2682
| ½ ||  || ½ || ½ || ½ || ½ || ½ || ½ || ½ || 1 || ½ || 1 || 6½ ||  ||  || || || 2749
|-
| 3 || align=left|||2704
| 0 || ½ ||  || ½ || 1 || ½ || 1 || 0 || ½ || ½ || 1 || ½ || 6 || 6 ||  || || || 2710
|-
| 4 || align=left| ||2728
| 0 || ½ || ½ ||  || ½ || ½ || ½ || ½ || 1 || ½ || 1 || ½ || 6 || 5 || || || || 2708
|-
| 5 || align=left| ||2666
| ½ || ½ || 0 || ½ ||  || ½ || ½ || 1 || 0 || 1 || ½ || ½ || 5½ || 6 ||  || || || 2677
|-
| 6 || align=left| ||2720
| ½ || ½ || ½ || ½ || ½ ||  || ½ || ½ || ½ || ½ || ½ || ½ || 5½ || 5 ||  30.25 || || || 2672
|-
| 7 || align=left| ||2624
| ½ || ½ || 0 || ½ || ½ || ½ ||  || 1 || ½ || 0 || ½ || 1 || 5½ || 5 || 29.75 || 2 || 4 || 2681
|-
| 8 || align=left| ||2659
| ½ || ½ || 1 || ½ || 0 || ½ || 0 ||  || ½ || ½ || ½ || 1 || 5½ || 5 || 29.75 || 2 || 3½ || 2678
|-
| 9 || align=left| ||2710
| 0 || ½ || ½ || 0 || 1 || ½ || ½ || ½ ||  || 1 || ½ || ½ || 5½ || 5 || 28.75 || || || 2673
|-
| 10 || align=left| ||2602
| ½ || 0 || ½ || ½ || 0 || ½ || 1 || ½ || 0 ||  || ½ || ½ || 4½ || 6 || 24.25 || 1 || || 2610
|-
| 11 || align=left| ||2657
| ½ || ½ || 0 || 0 || ½ || ½ || ½ || ½ || ½ || ½ ||  || ½ || 4½ || 6 || 24.25 || 0 || || 2605
|-
| 12 || align=left| ||2639
| ½ || 0 || ½ || ½ || ½ || ½ || 0 || 0 || ½ || ½ || ½ ||  || 4 ||  ||  || || || 2571
|}

 Women 
{| class="wikitable" style="text-align: center;"
|+71st Russian Women's Championship Superfinal, 9–20 October 2021, Ufa, Russia, Category VII (2422)
! !! Player !! Rating !! 1 !! 2 !! 3 !! 4 !! 5 !! 6 !! 7 !! 8 !! 9 !! 10 !! 11 !! 12 !! Total !!  !! SB !! TPR
|-
|-style="background:#ccffcc;"
| 1 || align=left| ||2462
| || ½ || ½ || 1 || ½ || ½ || 1 || ½ || 1 || 1 || ½ || 1 || 8 ||  ||  || 2593
|-
| 2 || align=left| ||2331
| ½ ||  || ½ || ½ || 1 || ½ || ½ || ½ || 1 || 1 || 1 || ½ || 7½ || 6 ||  || 2563
|-
| 3 || align=left|||2509
| ½ || ½ ||  || ½ || ½ || 1 || ½ || ½ || 1 || ½ || 1 || 1 || 7½ || 5 ||  || 2547
|-
| 4 || align=left| ||2493
| 0 || ½ || ½ ||  || 1 || 1 || 1 || ½ || 1 || ½ || ½ || 0 || 6½ ||  || || 2480
|-
| 5 || align=left| ||2467
| ½ || 0 || ½ || 0 ||  || ½ || ½ || 1 || 1 || ½ || 1 || ½ || 6 || 6 ||  || 2454
|-
| 6 || align=left| ||2409
| ½ || ½ || 0 || 0 || ½ ||  || ½ || ½ || 1 || ½ || 1 || 1 || 6 || 5 ||  || 2459
|-
| 7 || align=left| ||2421
| 0 || ½ || ½ || 0 || ½ || ½ ||  || 1 || ½ || 1 || 0 || 1 || 5½ ||  ||  || 2422
|-
| 8 || align=left| ||2410
| ½ || ½ || ½ || ½ || 0 || ½ || 0 ||  || 0 || ½ || ½ || 1 || 4½ ||  ||  || 2358
|-
| 9 || align=left| ||2394
| 0 || 0 || 0 || 0 || 0 || 0 || ½ || 1 ||  || 1 || 1 || ½ || 4 ||  ||  || 2322
|-
| 10 || align=left| ||2357
| 0 || 0 || ½ || ½ || ½ || ½ || 0 || ½ || 0 ||  || ½ || ½ || 3½ || 6 || 18.75 || 2295
|-
| 11 || align=left| ||2415
| ½ || 0 || 0 || ½ || 0 || 0 || 1 || ½ || 0 || ½ ||  || ½ || 3½ || 6 || 18.50 || 2289
|-
| 12 || align=left| ||2392
| 0 || ½ || 0 || 1 || ½ || 0 || 0 || 0 || ½ || ½ || ½ ||  || 3½''' || 5 ||  || 2291
|}

References

External links

 RUSBASE (part V) 1919-1937,1991-1994
 RUSBASE (part IV) 1938-1960
 RUSBASE (part III), 1961-1969,1985-1990
 RUSBASE (part II) 1970-1984
 Russian Chess History by Bill Wall.
Details on the 2007 edition

Chess national championships
Championship
National championships in Russia